= Fu Jen Catholic University =

Catholic University in New Taipei City, Taiwan

Coordinates: 25°2′8.9″N 121°25′59.4″E

- 天主教輔仁大學
- Former name: Catholic University of Peking (1925–1950)
- Motto: 真、善、美、聖 (Mandarin); Sanctitas, Bonitas, Pulchritudo, Veritas (Latin)
- Motto in English: Sanctity, Beauty, Goodness, Truth
- Type: Private, Catholic, Coeducational Higher education institution
- Established: 1925; 101 years ago
- Founders: Barry O'Toole and Aurelius Stehle
- Religious affiliation: Roman Catholic (Jesuit and SVD)
Academic affiliations
AACSB AALAU ACUCA AJCU-AP ELECT EUTW	IFCU Tsinghua Alliance UMAP United Board
- Chairman: Peter Liu Cheng-chung
- President: Francis Yi-Chen Lan
- Faculty: 1,942
- Undergraduates: 22,395
- Postgraduates: 4,041
- Location: New Taipei City, Taiwan
- Colors: Vatican Yellow; Virgin Blue; Angel White
- Website: fju.edu.tw

Chinese name
- Traditional Chinese: 天主教輔仁大學
- Simplified Chinese: 天主教辅仁大学
Transcriptions
Standard Mandarin
- Hanyu Pinyin: Tiānzhǔjiào fǔ rén dàxué
Southern Min
- Hokkien POJ: Thian-chú-kàu Hú-jîn Tāi-ha̍k

Fu Jen Catholic University (FJU, FJCU or Fu Jen; Chinese: 天主教輔仁大學) is a private Catholic university in New Taipei City, Taiwan. The university was founded in 1925 in Beijing at the request of Pope Pius XI and re-established in Taiwan in 1961 at the request of Pope John XXIII.

Fu Jen consists of twelve colleges and schools, among which are several of Taiwan's first or only academic units in Italian language, info-management, museology, religious studies, philosophy. The campus is served by Fu Jen University Station, Taiwan's first metro station named after a university.

Fu Jen is the oldest Catholic and Jesuit-affiliated institution of higher education in the Sinophone world, under the direct authority of the Congregation for Catholic Education of the Holy See. It is also a non-state actor of Track II diplomacy in the Holy See–Taiwan relations. Therefore, Fu Jen has special importance internationally and is known for its strong ties with the Roman Curia. In the past nearly one hundred years of history, the Benedictine, the Verbites, and the Jesuits from all over the world have participated in the management of the university.

The university has the nation's first business school there with AACSB accreditation and also the medical college was the earliest to promote PBL as pedagogy for medical education. Fu Jen alumni include Premier Lin Chuan, former First Lady of China Wang Guangmei, and politicians in the Legislative Yuan.

== History ==
=== Early history ===
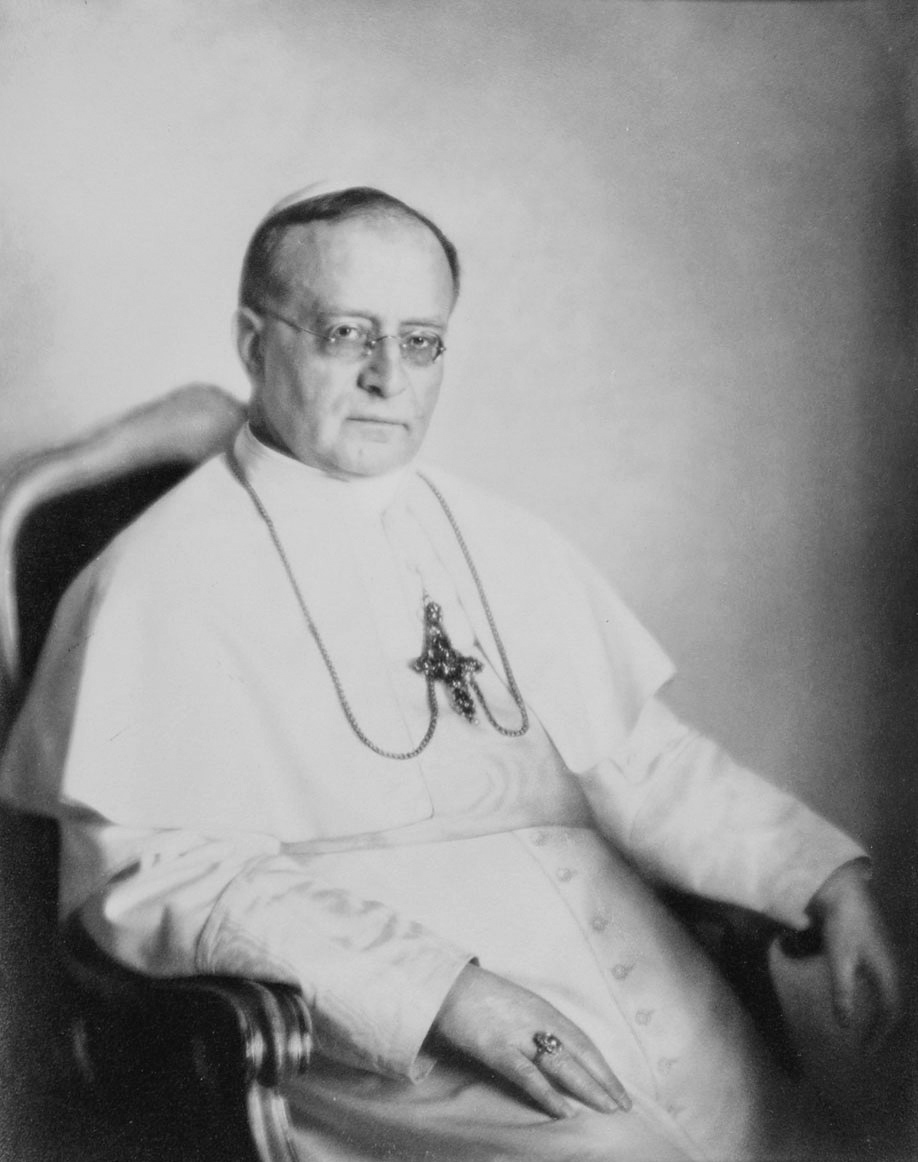
Pope Pius XI funded £100,000 to support the founding of the university.

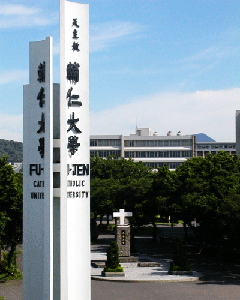
Fu Jen main entrance since 1963.

The institution was originally established in Beijing in 1925 by the Benedictines of St. Vincent Archabbey in Latrobe, Pennsylvania, at the request of the Holy See, with Archabbot Aurelius Stehle serving as chancellor. Fu Jen, then commonly known as the Catholic University of Peking, was itself a successor to the Fu Jen Academy (Chinese: 輔仁社), which was created through the efforts of Catholic scholars Ma Xiangbo and Ying Lianzhi. The university's first president (1925–1927) was the American missionary George Barry O'Toole, OSB. He was succeeded by Chen Yuan, a Chinese Protestant and renowned historian, who remained university president until the school's forced closure by the Chinese Communist government in 1952.

In 1933 the Benedictines in the United States, in the midst of the Great Depression, were no longer able to sustain Fu Jen's mission. Administration of the university passed to the Society of the Divine Word in Germany. Its affiliation with Germany, an ally of Imperial Japan, helped protect university personnel from extreme brutality inflicted elsewhere by occupying Imperial Japanese soldiers during the Sino-Japanese War (1937–1945).

=== After World War II ===
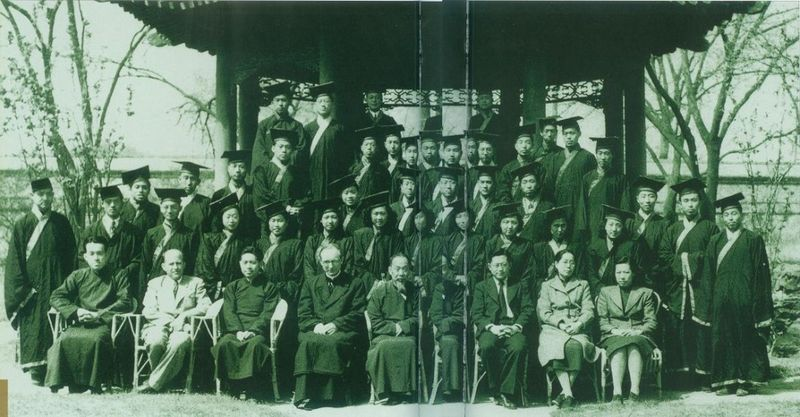
Graduates of the Fu Jen Catholic University, 1947.

Since the university's operation had not been interrupted by the war, it quickly became one of China's top science programs. Well-known scientists such as Chien Shih-Liang taught at Fu Jen, and graduates such as Lee C. Teng and Wang Guangmei became famous alumni. On December 24, 1945, Thomas Tien Ken-sin, the university chairman, was made a cardinal. The following year, the School of Agriculture was added and preparations for the School of Medicine began. Also in the same year, the first Taiwan Alumni Association of Fu Jen was established in Dadu, Taichung, Taiwan.

After the Communists assumed power in China in 1949, religious organisations, including the Catholic Church, began to be systematically repressed. In 1952 this intensified and the government merged Fu Jen with the Beijing Normal University, Peking University, Renmin University, China University of Political Science and Law, and Central University of Finance and Economics. Under Mao Zedong's arrangement, Chen Yuan, the former president of Fu Jen, was transferred to the Normal University as the new president.

=== Cold War era ===
Although the Taiwan Provincial Government promised to donate land near Yuanshan Area in Taipei in 1948 to serve as the school site for Fu Jen to move to Taiwan, the Roman headquarters of the Society of the Divine Word soon ordered the suspension of all activities. The following year, the university's American representative Rev. Ralph Thyken, S.V.D. came to Tokyo, Japan, to prepare for the establishment of a new Nagoya Catholic University, which is now Nanzan University. Until the Holy See formally ordered the university's re-establishment in Taiwan, the history of Fu Jen was interrupted for about ten years.

Fu Jen Catholic University was re-established in 1961 in Taiwan, and Paul Yu Pin, the former Ordinary of Roman Catholic Archdiocese of Nanjing, was appointed as the new president by Pope John XXIII. The new school opened under the auspices of the Chinese Regional Bishops' Conference, the Society of Jesus, and the Society of the Divine Word.

The new Fu Jen's academics sprouted from Western history, medieval philosophy, Christian thought, and European languages. It is the only comprehensive university in Taiwan that fully integrates Western thought, history, language, religion, and art. Since the 1960s, the university's philosophical tradition has been Scholasticism and Paul Yu Pin's "Three Kinds of Knowing" (三知論), focusing on the development of a Catholic philosophy that incorporates Confucianism and opposing the "relativism hegemony".

During the thirty years of the Cold War, many Western priests and nuns were sent to teach at the university and imported advanced scholarship into Taiwan. Many professors have been commended for this in recent years, such as Daniel Ross from the United States, Leopoldo Vicente from Spain, Marcina Stawasz from Poland, etc.

=== Modern era ===
In 1997, the 14th Dalai Lama came to Fu Jen to hold a Dharma promotion conference (lecture) and held talks with Taiwan Governor James Soong (Taiwan's second most powerful person) in the university president's office.

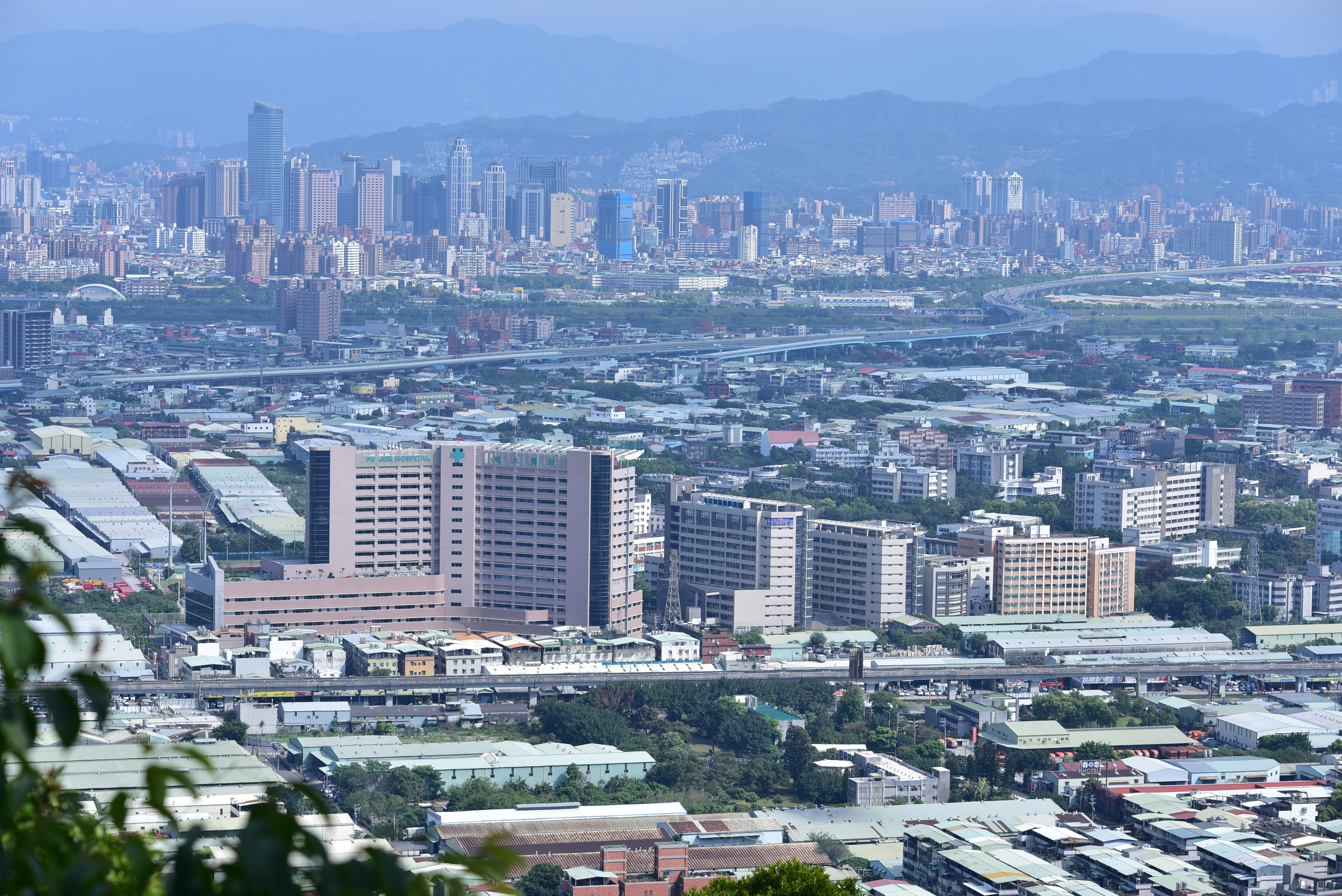
Auxiliary the hospital, North of Fu Jen Campus, and Taoyuan Airport MRT (2018)

Fu Jen has expanded rapidly since the 1990s. The number of students and social influence has long maintained the top five in the country, and the number of colleges has been closely following the National Taiwan University. So far in the 21st century, the university has since grown to comprise twelve colleges and schools and a hospital. In 2001, Fu Jen has been the first college in Taiwan that actively reduces tuition and fees.

Fu Jen Catholic University Hospital was opened in September 2017. The College of Medicine can be used as a conduit for cooperation between different academic disciplines, and assume a leading role in bringing together the colleges of biotechnology, chemistry, physics, engineering, management, and foreign languages. The establishment of a completely new curriculum and unique program will include training in hospital management and medical translation, research in laser technology and biotechnology, integration of Western and Chinese medicine, and robotic surgery.

== Ideal and governance ==
The university motto, 真、善、美、聖 (Veritas, Bonitas, Pulchritudo, Sanctitas in Latin), expresses four ideals: truth, goodness, beauty and sanctity.

The laurel wreath symbolizes honor and peace while the twelve stars signify the Virgin Mary. The cross represents the Christian faith. The two colors on the shield suggest Christ's dual nature as the rounded shape of the shield recalls the Sacred Heart. The Latin words on the banner beneath the emblem, the university motto, express the four ideals of the university while the three folds of the banner suggest the Trinity.

Based on the Christian faith, the university president clearly supports the abolition of the death penalty, opposes abortion, and opposes the utilitarianization of higher education.

Chairman of the Board of Trustees

- 1929–1947 Chang Ki
- 1960–1967 Thomas Tien Ken-sin
- 1967–1992 Soong Mei-ling
- 1992–1993 Paul Shan Kuo-hsi
- 1993–1999 Joseph Ti-kang
- 1999–2008 Paul Shan Kuo-hsi
- 2008–2009 Joseph Wang Yu-jung
- 2009–present: Peter Liu Cheng-chung

Presidents

- 1925–1929 George Barry O'Toole
- 1929–1952 Chen Yuan
- 1959–1978 Paul Yu Pin
- 1978–1992 Stanislaus Lo Kuang
- 1992–1996 Gabriel Chen-Ying Ly
- 1996–2000 Peter Tuen-Ho Yang
- 2000–2004 John Ning-Yuean Lee, KHS
- 2004–2012 Bernard Li, KSG, KHS
- 2012–2024: Vincent Han-Sun Chiang
- 2024–present: Francis Yi-Chen Lan

== Impact ==
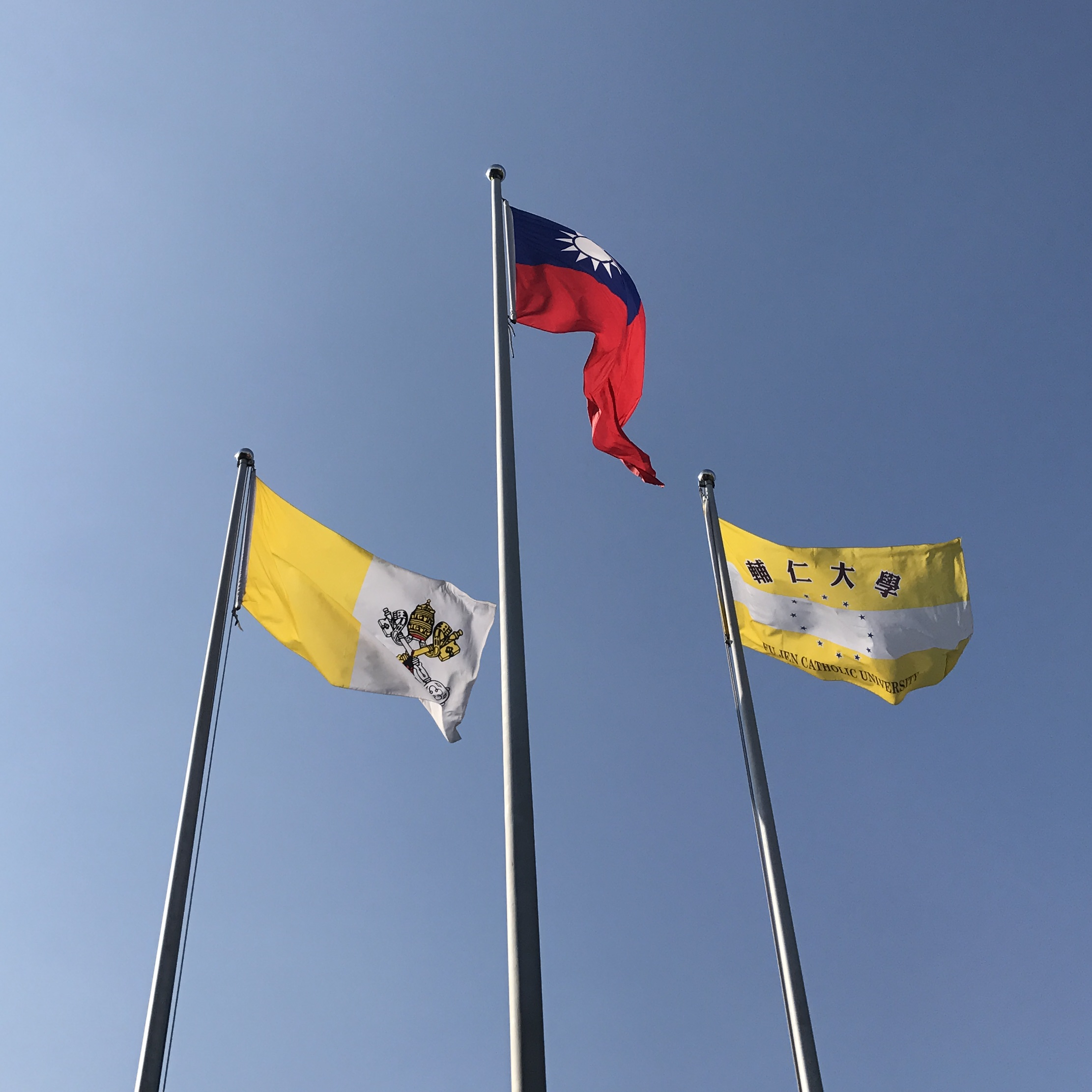
From left to right: The flags of Vatican City, Republic of China (Taiwan), and the university flag displayed in the university.

Relying on the authority of the Vatican and the Society of the Divine Word, Fu Jen, then known as the Catholic University of Peking, was the only university in Beijing that was not taken over and controlled by Empire of Japan during the Second Sino-Japanese War. In the white terror period of the cold war, Fu Jen was able to prevent the Kuomintang regime from interfering in school affairs and protect the students' freedom of speech under the serious concern of the Secretariat of State (Holy See).

Fu Jen Catholic University belongs to the International Federation of Catholic Universities (IFCU) under the United Nations Educational, Scientific and Cultural Organization (UNESCO). After the United Nations General Assembly Resolution 2758 came into effect in 1971, Fu Jen is the only university in Taiwan that has continuously participated in UNESCO for a long time. In the official Holy See–Taiwan relations, the university has repeatedly promoted substantial exchanges between the two countries. All the traditional Taiwanese ambassadors to the Holy See will be awarded an honorary doctorate degree from Fu Jen after leaving office. All the papal nuncio in Taiwan will also participate in the annual university opening ceremony.

The appointment and removal of the post of Fu Jen university president is a matter of inquiry by the secretary of state of the Holy See, and has been compared with the membership of the United Nations of the Republic of China (Taiwan). The issue of the internal reorganization of Fu Jen has also widely affected the intervention of the Ministry of Education of the two countries and the papal nuncio to Taiwan.

The chairman or the president of the university has always accompanied the president of Taiwan to visit the Holy See. In 2005, under the intervention of Fu Jen, the seat of the Taiwanese president was placed in the first row of heads of state, ahead of the US vice president Dick Cheney and German chancellor Angela Merkel. In 2013, the university further designated the products of the Fu Jen alumni's enterprise Franz-porcelains as the official national gift, which were presented to Pope Francis and the retired Pope Benedict XVI respectively.

== Academics ==
College/school	Founded
College of Liberal Arts	1927
College of Education	1929
College of Science and Engineering	1929
College of Human Ecology	1939
College of Foreign Languages	1963
School of Law	1963
College of Management	1969
College of Fine Arts	1983
College of Medicine	1990
College of Social Science	2003
College of Communication	2010
College of Fashion & Textiles	2017

The university at present comprises 12 colleges with more than 25,000 students.

- College of Liberal Arts
  - Department of Chinese Literature
  - Department of History
  - Department of Philosophy
- College of Fine Arts
  - Department of Music
  - Department of Applied Arts
  - Department of Landscape Architecture (CH)
  - Bachelor's degree program of Art and Cultural Creation (CH)
- College of Communication
  - Department of Communication Arts
  - Department of Journalism & Communication Studies
  - Department of Advertising & Public Relations
  - Graduate Institute of Mass Communication
- College of Education
  - Department of Physical Education
  - Department of Library and Information Science
  - Graduate of Educational Leadership and Development
  - Program of Sport Recreation Management
- College of Fashion and Textiles
  - Department of Textiles and Clothing
  - Graduate Institute of Museum Studies
  - MA Program in Brand and Fashion Management
- College of Medicine
  - School of Medicine
  - Department of Nursing
  - Department of Public Health
  - Department of Clinical Psychology
  - Department of Occupational Therapy
  - Department of Respiratory Therapy
  - Graduate Institute of Biomedical and Pharmaceutical Science
  - MS Program in Transdisciplinary Long Term Care
  - MS Program in Biomedical Big Data Analysis
  - Ph.D. Program in Pharmaceutical Biotechnology
- College of Science and Engineering
  - Department of Mathematics
  - Department of Physics
  - Department of Chemistry
  - Department of Life Science
  - Department of Computer Science & Information Engineering
  - Department of Electrical Engineering (Electronic Engineering)
  - Bachelor's Program in Medical Informatics and Innovative Applications
  - Graduate Institute of Applied Science and Engineering
  - Bachelor Program in Software Engineering and Digital Innovation Application
  - Bachelor Program in Artificial Intelligence and Information Security
- College of Foreign Languages and Literatures
  - Department of English Language and Literature
  - Department of German Language and Culture
  - Department of French Language and Culture
  - Department of Spanish Language and Culture
  - Department of Japanese Language and Culture
  - Department of Italian Language and Culture
  - Graduate Institute of Cross-Cultural Studies
- College of Human Ecology
  - Department of Child and Family Studies
  - Department of Restaurant, Hotel and Institutional Management
  - Department of Food Sciences
  - Department of Nutrition Science
  - Ph. D. Program in Nutrition and Food Science
- School of Law
  - Department of Law
  - Department of Financial and Economic Law
  - Graduate Department of Law
- College of Social Science
  - Department of Sociology
  - Department of Social Work
  - Department of Economics
  - Department of Religious Studies
  - Department of Psychology
  - Bachelor's Program in Catholic Studies
  - Master Program in Non-Profit Organization Management
- College of Management
  - Department of Business Administration
  - Department of Accounting
  - Department of Statistics and Information Science
  - Department of Finance and International Business
  - Department of Information Management
  - Graduate Institute of Business Administration
  - MS Program of Technology Management
  - Master Program of Global Entrepreneurial Management
  - Master of Global Entrepreneurial Management (MGEM – FJU, IQS, and USF)
  - MBA Program in International Management (imMBA)
  - Master's Program in Social Enterprise
  - Bachelor's Program of Business Management

=== Teaching ===
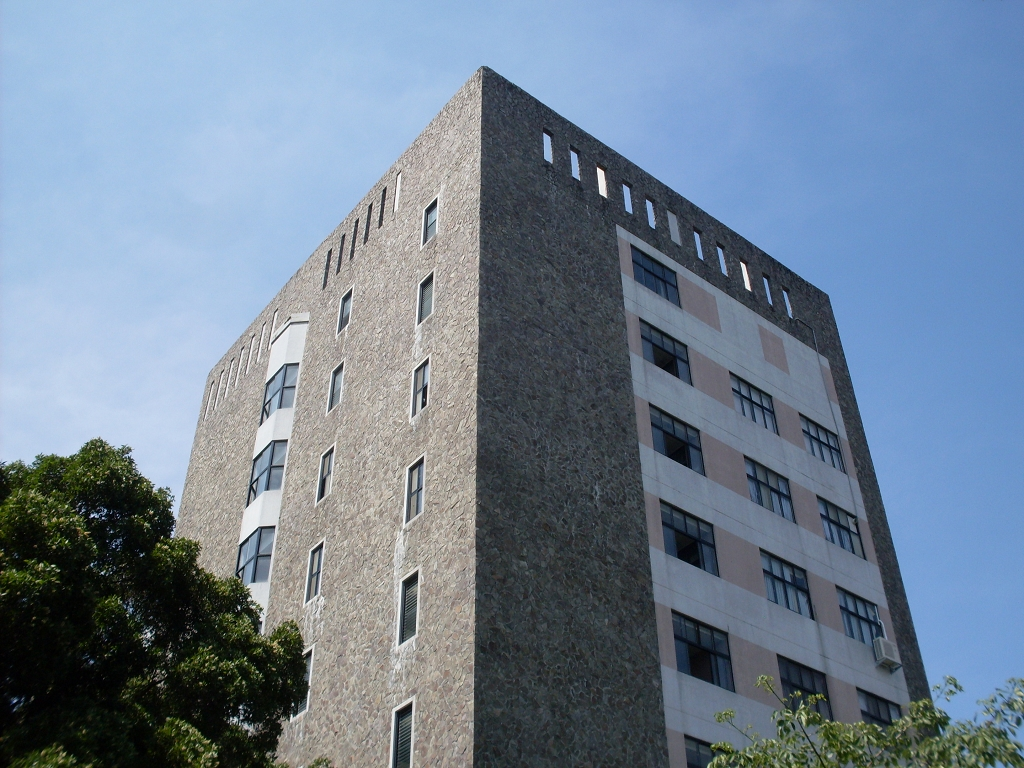
Divine Word Academic Highrise, the last 20th century Fu Jen building.

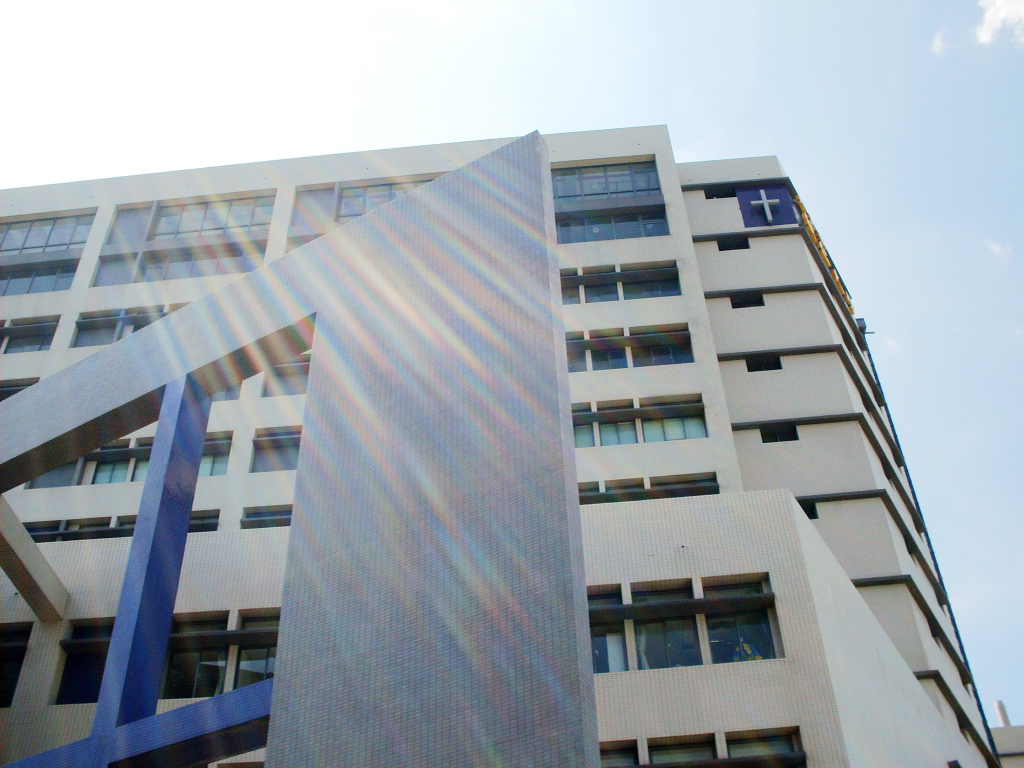
A corner of Fu Jen College of Medicine new building.

Fu Jen University established Taiwan's first graduate-level program in conference interpreting, the Graduate Institute of Translation and Interpreting Studies (GITIS). Also Fu Jen has annexed a Mandarin Language Center, established in 1964 to address the need for foreign missionaries to learn Chinese teaching hundreds of students each semester from countries worldwide Taiwanese, and every semester offers cultural classes such as Chinese Poetry, Chinese calligraphy, and Taijiquan.

The School of Medicine is one of the medical schools in Taiwan to adopt the pedagogy, "problem-based learning (PBL)", first developed at McMaster University Medical School in Canada, so that students can acquire medical knowledge from small group discussions and case studies. The implementation of PBL has won applause from the Taiwan Medical Accreditation Council and brought a wave of reform in medical education in Taiwan. In order to successfully practice PBL, the School has recruited basic scientists with specialties in various areas as well as more than one hundred clinicians as a strong backbone for teaching. Fu Jen's is the only medical school in Taiwan which uses PBL as a pedagogy for the third and fourth year curriculum.

=== Research ===
Fu Jen Catholic University has a long history of publishing journals. The main journals are as follows:

- Monumenta Serica
- Universitas: Monthly Review of Philosophy and Culture^{A&HCI}
- Fu Jen Studies
- Fu Jen Law Review
- Fu Jen Journal of Chinese Literature
- Journal of the Pre-Qin and Han Dynasties
- Journal of The Graduate Institute Chinese Literature Department of Fu Jen Catholic University
- Fu-Jen Journal of Medicine
- Fu Jen Management Review
- Fu Jen Journal of Foreign Languages
- Fu Jen Historical Journal
- Fu Jen Religious Studies
- Journal of Physical Education Fu Jen Catholic University
- Social Analysis

Fu Jen Academia Catholica was inaugurated on August 1, 2008, to enable interdisciplinary pursuits in Catholic studies. The Academia consists of five Fu Jen academic institutes or centers: the Institute of Scholastic Philosophy, Institutum Historiae Ecclesiae, Center for the Study of Science and Religion, Monumenta Serica Sinological Research Center, and John Paul II Institute for Research into Dialogue for Peace.

=== Globalization ===
Fu Jen - Stanford
In September 2015, Fu Jen Catholic University has signed an agreement (MOU) to cooperate with Stanford Prevention Research Center, SPRC, promoted by Stanford University. The aim is to globally research the Wellness of humans.

Fu Jen - Oxford
In September 2012, Fu Jen Catholic University cooperated with the University of Oxford in the United Kingdom and the Pontifical University of Saint Thomas Aquinas in Italy and opened a new degree in philosophy and finance. The purpose is to emphasize the importance of the integrity for future Politicians and Financiers. The program combines the professional knowledge in finance and the idea in philosophy.

Fu Jen - IQS -USF
Master in Global Entrepreneurial Management (MGEM) is a joint-program offered by Fu Jen Catholic University, Ramon Llull University (IQS in Spain), and the University of San Francisco (USF in the US). It is ranked 43rd worldwide on the FT Masters in Management Rankings 2017.

Fu Jen - UC Berkeley
Professors from University of California, Berkeley, are constantly invited and hold lectures in Fu Jen Catholic University

Global Leadership Program with universities in Japan, Korea and Philippines
Since 2008, the Global Leadership Program was started for students from four Jesuit universities in East Asia: Sophia University in Japan, Sogang University in South Korea, Ateneo de Manila University in the Philippines and Fu Jen Catholic University in Taiwan.

Service-Learning Center
In 2015, Fu Jen Catholic University Service-Learning Center organised the 5th Asia-Pacific Regional Conference on Service-Learning.

== Rankings & Reputation ==
University rankings

Global – Overall
- ARWU World: n/a (2022)
- QS World: 1201–1400 (2024)
- THE World: 1001–1200 (2023)
- USNWR Global: 1526 (2023)

Regional – Overall
- QS Asia: 261–270 (2023)
- THE Asia: 301–350 (2023)

National – Overall
- QS National: 20 (tie) (2024)
- THE National: 16 (tie) (2023)

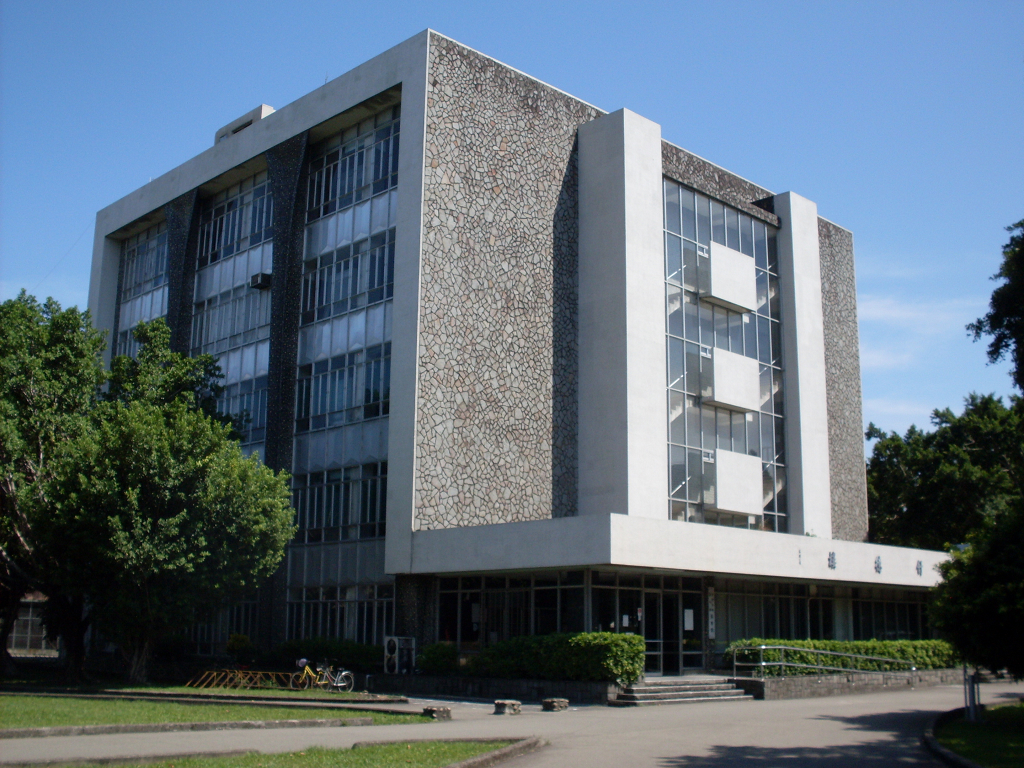
Schutte Memorial Building, former Natural Science Library affiliated to the Society of the Divine Word.

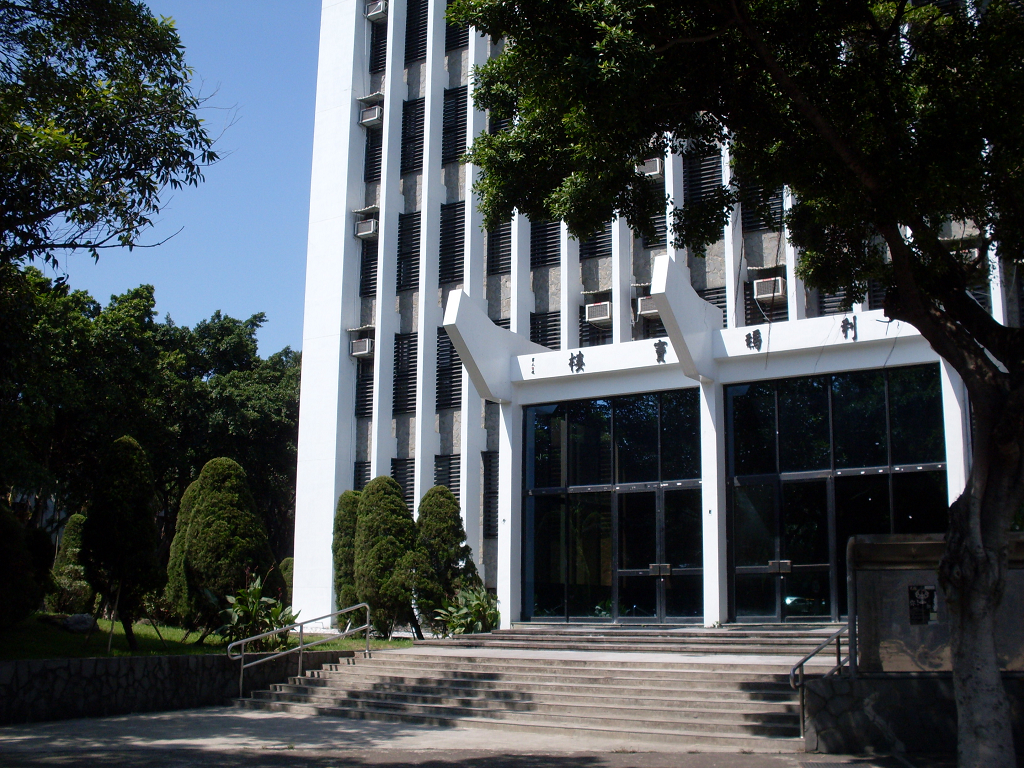
Fu Jen College of Management is ranked fifth and the best business school in private universities in Taiwan.

Fu Jen ranks at the top of Taiwan's private universities for top-ranked fields of study and distinguished alumni. The university has always been ranked in the QS World University Rankings and Times Higher Education World University Rankings, which is among the top 10% in the whole country. In addition, Fu Jen is the representative university of New Taipei City by QS Most Affordable Cities for Students Ranking. The Mayor of New Taipei City once pointed out in 2021 that "Fu Jen is the core of talent, academics and medical care in New Taipei City".

Fu Jen College of Management is a business school in Taiwan, which features an international focus with Amazon Web Services cloud computing teaching resources integrated into it's curriculum.

In 2014, the representative of Japan in Taiwan listed Fu Jen Catholic University as one of the seven well-known Taiwanese universities.

Taiwan's Most Popular University Ranking
According to a survey conducted by the electronic media DailyView in 2018, Fu Jen ranks 4th among 141 universities in Taiwan, and is also ranked 1st among private universities. In fact, the university is also the third-largest university in the country with the largest number of students.

World's Top Catholic Universities Ranking
According to 2021 uniRank Top Catholic Universities in the world, Fu Jen ranks 1st in Taiwan, 3rd in Asia, 54th worldwide among 610 universities.

Times Higher Education Impact Ranking
In 2020, Fu Jen is ranked as 201st-300th by Times Higher Education Impact Ranking (5th nationally).

Times Higher Education Ranking
In 2020, Fu Jen is ranked top 1000 worldwide (10th nationally) by Times Higher Education World University Rankings, and the citation rate of the paper is ranked 7th nationally.
In 2021, Fu Jen is ranked 168th in by Times Higher Education Asia University Rankings.

Global Entrepreneurial Management by Financial Times UK
In 2020, the cooperated Program "Master of Global Entrepreneurial Management" between Fu Jen, Instituto Químico de Sarriá Barcelona, IQS School of Management in Spain and University of San Francisco in the United States was ranked 19th globally by Financial Times, United Kingdom.

APQN Internal Quality Insurance Reward
In 2012, Fu Jen became a member of Asia-Pacific Quality Network, APQN. In 2013, Fu Jen has again passed the evaluation of the APQN International Conference Assessment. It was the only university, which was awarded in Taiwan.

AACSB Global Business Accreditation
In April 2005, Fu Jen obtained the most authorized certification of business school and MBA degree from AACSB. Only five universities in Taiwan obtained the certification.

IFT International Certification
The Department of Food Science at Fu Jen Catholic University was reviewed by the Higher Education Review Board (HERB) of the Institute of Food Technologists (IFT), and successfully obtained the IFT International Certification. It also became the first in Taiwan to obtain IFT Certified academic unit.

== Campus ==
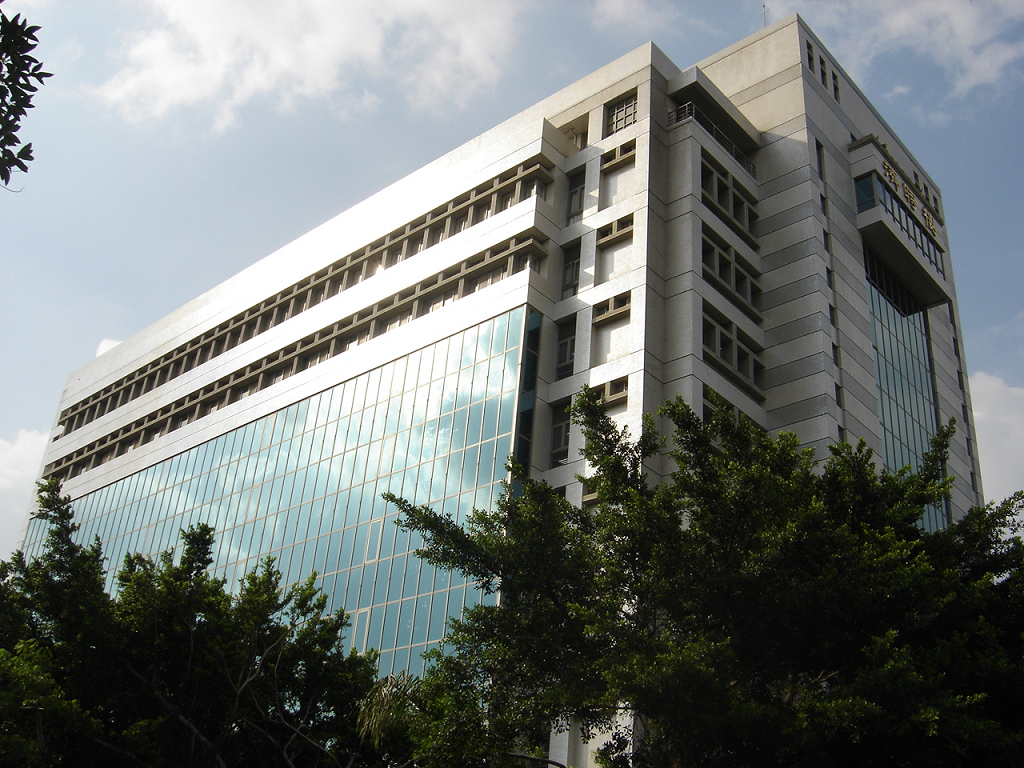
Fahy Memorial Library

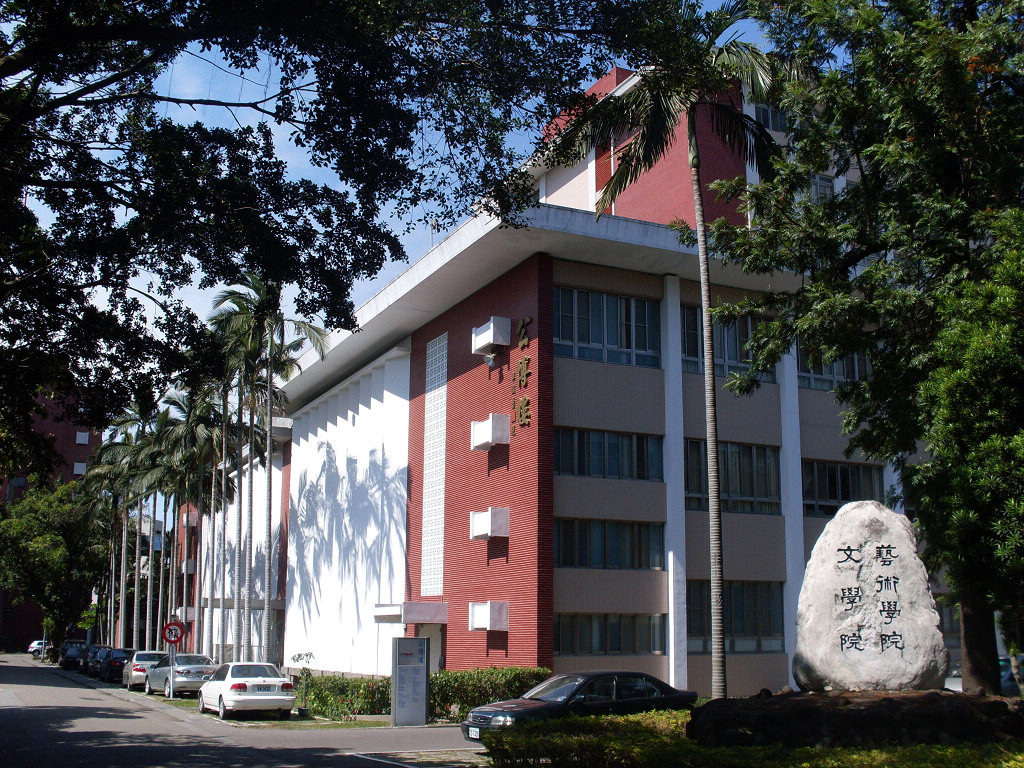
Kungpo Memorial Library

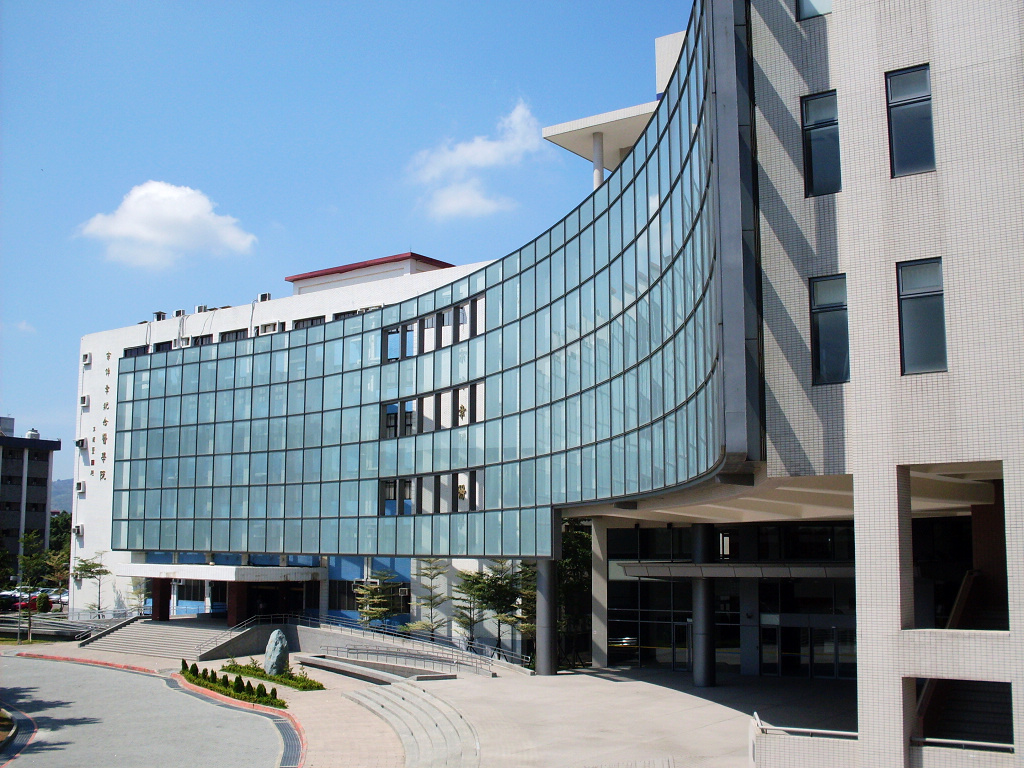
Cardinal Shan Library

The campus of Fu Jen Catholic University (including the University Hospital) is 348,360 square meters, the size is close to the Vatican City State, Japan's Kyushu Imperial University Hakozaki Campus, and the world-renowned Osaka University Toyonaka Campus.

Fu Jen's Xinzhuang campus is known as "tree house campus".

- Before 1951: Dingfu Street, Xicheng District, Beijing (today Beijing Normal University north campus and CPCA building). It is located in Shichahai area in central Beijing and surrounded by ancient Hutong. The Prince Kung's Mansion used to be part of Fu Jen's campus.
- After the 1960s:
  - Main campus: Xinzhuang District, New Taipei (1963–present)
  - 2nd campus: Daan District, Taipei (1961–2011, today Chinese Regional Bishops' Conference building)

=== Libraries ===
- Kungpo Memorial Library (Library for College of Literature)
- Schutte Memorial Library (Library for College of Engineering; abolished)
- Fahy Memorial Library (General Library)
- Paul Cardinal Shan Library (Library for College of Medicine)
- Theology Library

=== Transportation ===
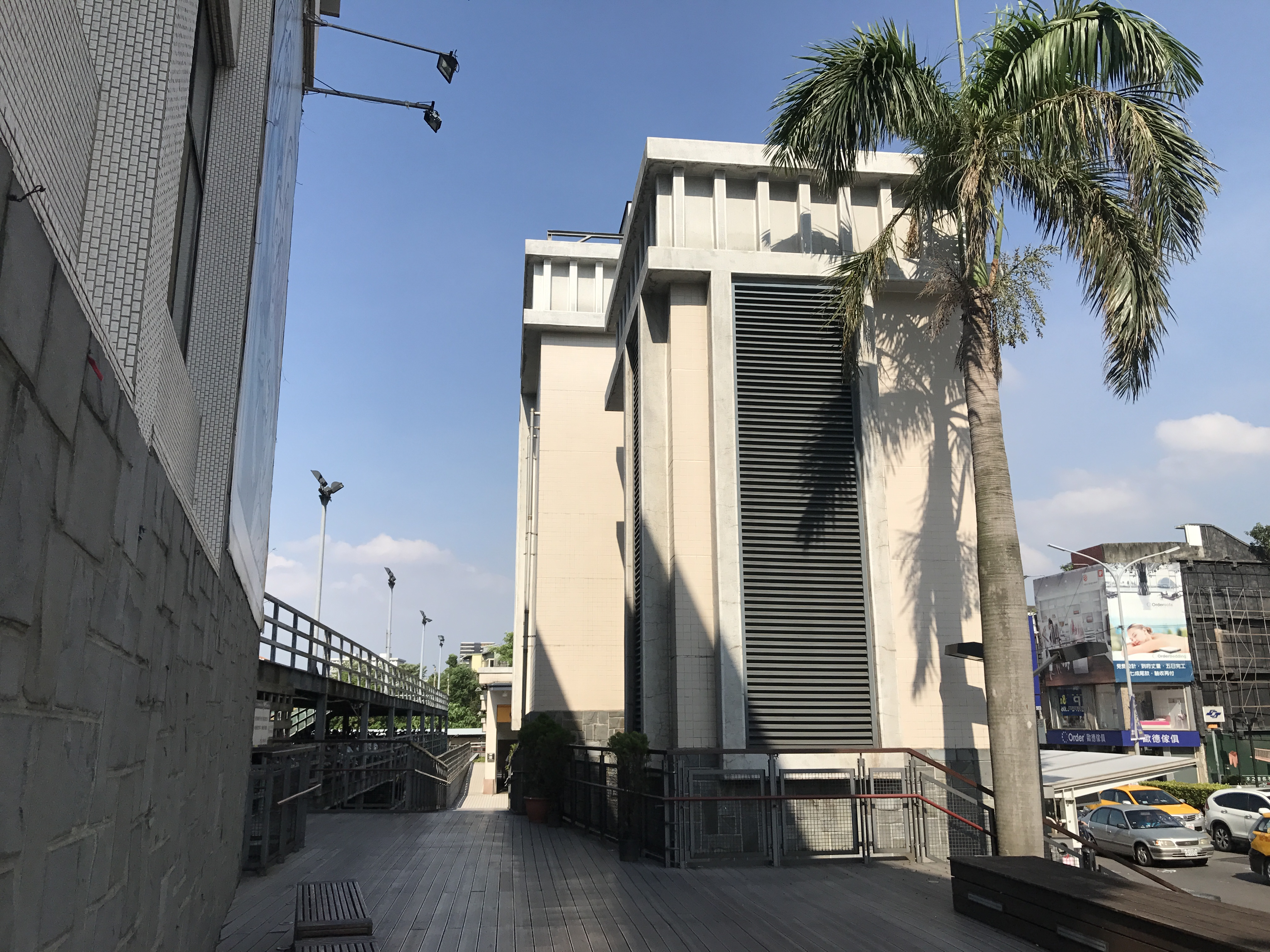
A special plank road from Exit 1 of the metro station to the main entrance of the university.

== Student life ==
The Ceremony of Venerating the Heavens and Ancestors (祭天敬祖大典) was held for the first time since Cardinal Paul Yu Pin in 1979, advocating gratitude to nature and thinking of ancestors. Freshmen from the Department of Chinese Literature will sing a section of Classic of Poetry in the ceremony.

=== Student groups ===
Fu Jen Catholic University currently has more than 100 student clubs, divided into 6 categories: academic, artistic, service, leisure and social, physical clubs, and musical clubs.

The Cyan Rhyme Award (輔大青韻獎) was founded in 1977, it is an annual singing and song composition competition. Many well-known singers and artists have participated in the competition when they were studying at Fu Jen, such as Jolin Tsai, F.I.R. and so on.

=== Religious tradition ===
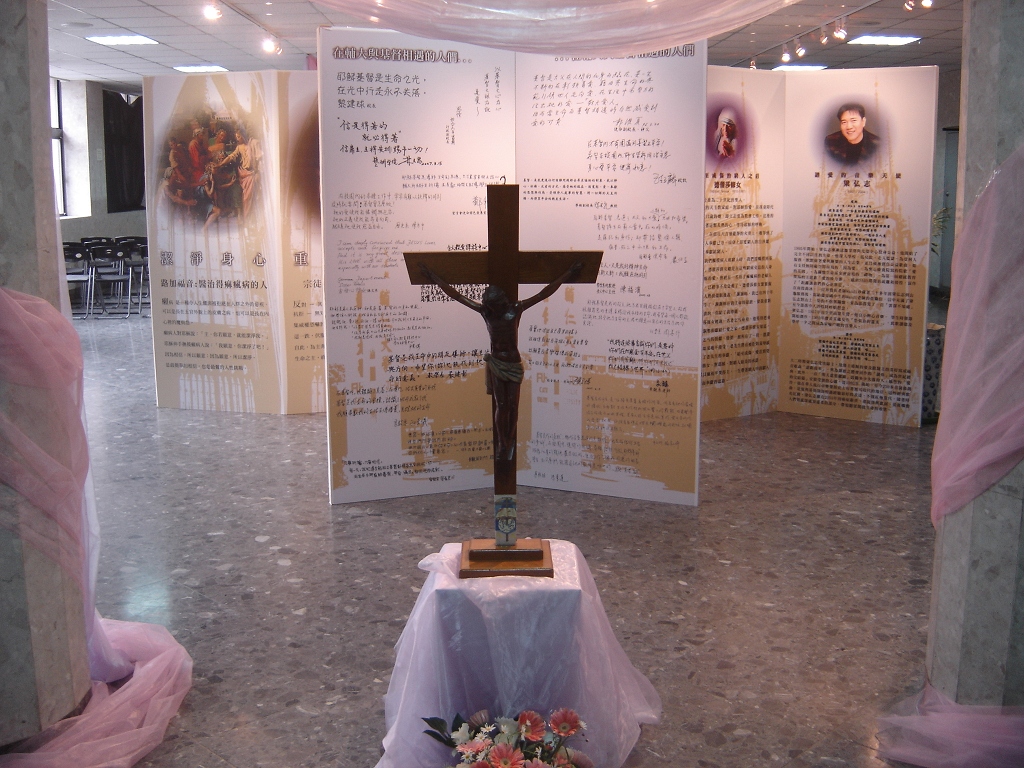
Decoration of the Religious Life Week.

Every year during the Catholic Lent, a two-week Religious Life Week is held to celebrate Catholic Holy Week and Easter. In October, the university priests hold the Pray for the Country Mass in the university chapel, praying for God's protection and blessing to the country, government officials, all the people and world peace.

During the martial law period, only Fu Jen and Tunghai University held College Christmas Balls in Taiwan, which is known as "the Fu Jen in the North, the Tunghai in the South (北輔大, 南東海)." This makes them the representative college Christmas ball in Taiwan.

=== Democratic tradition ===
Fu Jen professors and students are first initiators and participants for many famous student movements in the history of Taiwan and China, such as the May Fourth Movement, the December 9th Movement the Consciousness Movement, the Wild Lily student movement, the Reconciliation Movement of the Case of Su Chien-ho, the Losheng Sanatorium Retention Movement, and the Wild Strawberry Movement. At the end of Taiwan's martial law, the Fu Jen student once published the underground publication Reform (改造), which was the first demonstration of democratic activities on campus in Taiwan, but it was quickly banned.

In May of each year, Fu Jen regularly holds elections of student self-government organizations at all levels of the school (the president of the student union, members of the student council, representatives of all levels of university meetings, etc.) to implement student autonomy and democratic political education. Electronic voting was used for the first time in 2013 to enhance the convenience of student participation.

== Athletics ==
Fu Jen Catholic University has at least 31 school-level sports teams. The Fu Jen baseball team is the most famous university baseball team in Taiwan, it has created the reputation of "Taiwan's Sokei-sen". The Fu Jen Dragon Boat Team is the first international university dragon boat team in Taiwan and an important role in national sports diplomacy.

Fu Jen is also the only university in Taiwan that has a men's football team and a women's football team. It not only participates in the University Football Association, but also has the qualifications for the Taiwan Football Premier League and the Taiwan Mulan Football League. Several students have represented Taiwan to play in the AFC Cup.

Fu Jen has always been the cradle of East Asian professional baseball and professional basketball stars. Among other sports, Lee Fu-an (twice champion at the Asian Athletics Championships), Cheng Chao-tsun (2017 Summer Universiade Javelin gold medal, breaking Asian record), Kuo Hsing-chun (2020 Summer Olympics & 2017 Summer Universiade weightlifting gold medal), Lin Yun-Ju (2020 Summer Olympics bronze medal, Taiwan's youngest player in the World Table Tennis Championships) are all alumni or students of the university. In recent years, Fu Jen has consecutively ranked first among private schools in the National Intercollegiate Athletic Games in 2016, 2017 and 2018.

=== 2020 Summer Olympics ===
Fu Jen sent 8 athletes to participate in the 2020 Tokyo Olympics, and a total of 4 people won 3 medals for the Taiwanese team. Including the sixth gold medal in Taiwan's Olympic history.

Medal	Athletes	Sports	Subjects	Dates
Gold	Kuo Hsing-chun	Weightlifting	Women's 59 kg	July 27
Bronze	Lin Yun-Ju, Cheng I-ching	Table tennis	Mixed doubles	July 26
Bronze	Huang Hsiao-wen	Boxing	Women's flyweight	August 4

== Notable alumni ==
Fu Jen alumni (輔大人) number near 200,000; they work in various fields. Alumni working in political fields include at least 25 congressman in Legislative Yuan, 3 Taiwanese justices of Constitutional Court, 3 Taiwanese premiers and vice-premiers, 2 Taiwanese ministers and deputy-minister of national defense, a large number of Taiwanese diplomats, mayors and magistrates, and former Chinese first lady Wang Guangmei.

=== Politics and law ===
National politicians who attended Fu Jen Catholic University

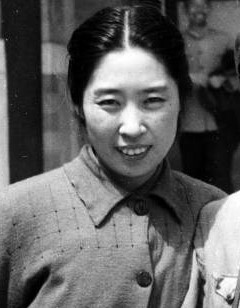
Wang Guangmei, Former Chinese First Lady

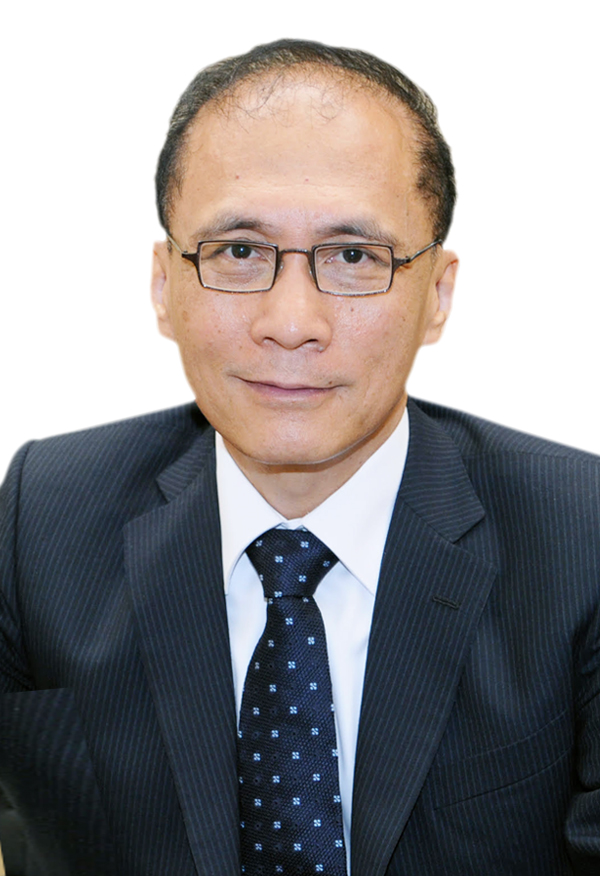
Lin Chuan, 48th Premier

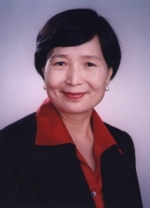
Yeh Chu-lan, 24th Vice Premier

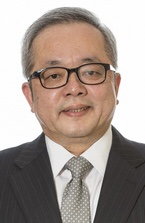
Shih Jun-ji, 36th Vice Premier

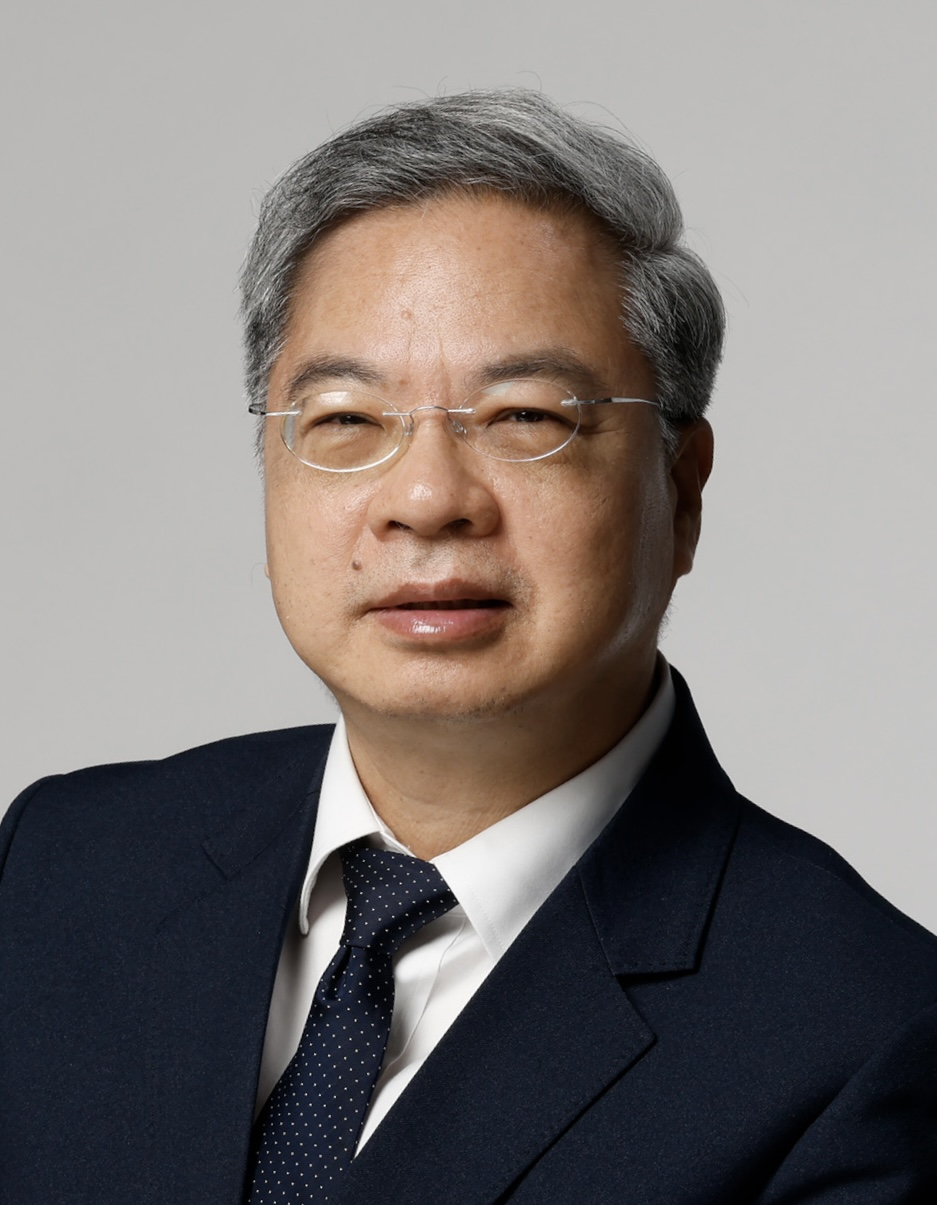
Kung Ming-hsin, 34th Minister of Economic Affairs

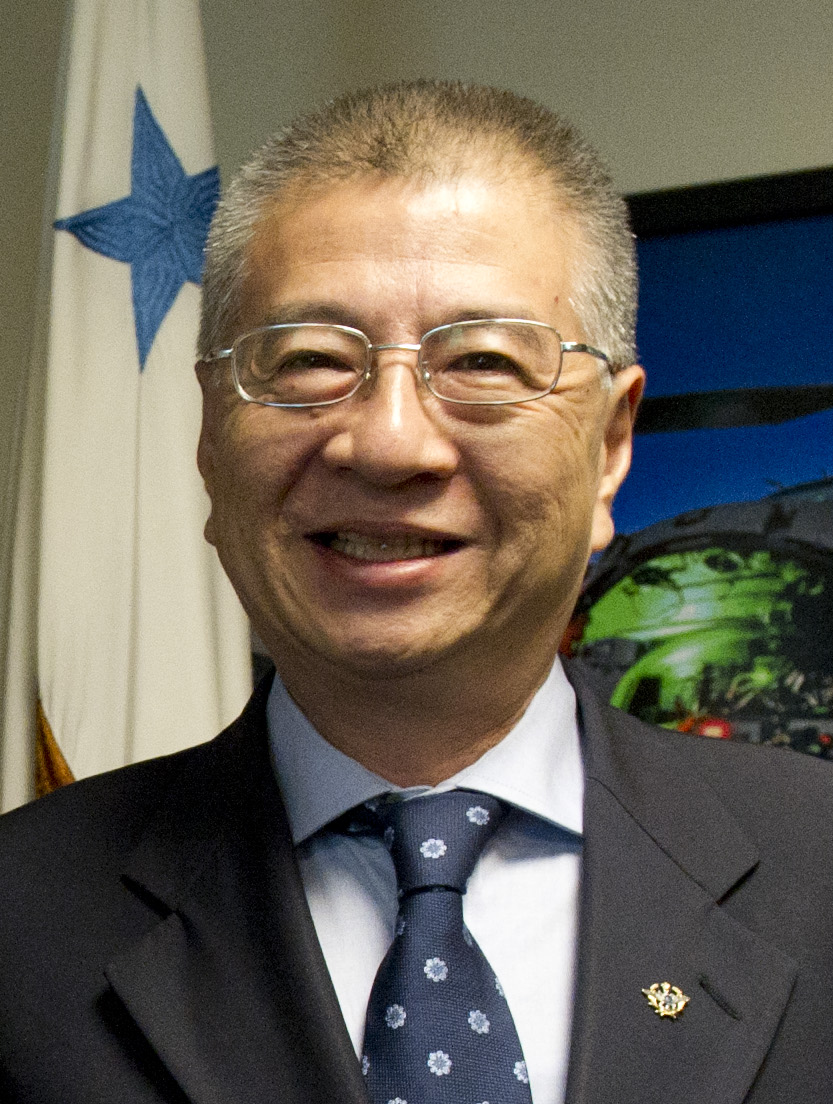
Andrew Nien-dzu Yang, 29th Minister of National Defense

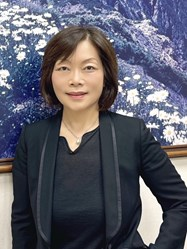
Ho Pei-shan, 6th Minister of Labor

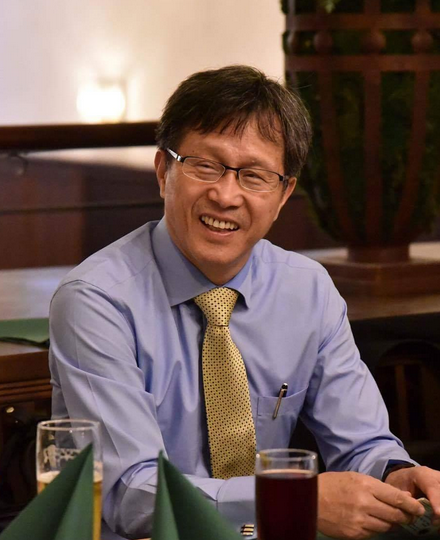
Shieh Jhy-wey, Taiwanese Representative to the EU and Belgium

Fu Jen Catholic University has produced numerous politicians, jurists, diplomats and public officials. Its alumni have included at least 25 members of the Legislative Yuan, 3 justices of Taiwan's Constitutional Court, 3 premiers or vice-premiers, and a large number of ministers, deputy ministers, magistrates, and other public figures. Among the best-known are Lin Chuan (林全), Taiwanese Premier; Yeh Chu-lan (葉菊蘭) and Shih Jun-ji (施俊吉), both Taiwanese Vice Premiers; Kung Ming-hsin (龔明鑫), Minister of Economic Affairs; Andrew Yang (楊念祖), Minister of National Defense; Andrew Hsia (夏立言), Minister of the Mainland Affairs Council; Chiang Been-huang (蔣丙煌), Minister of Health and Welfare; Wang Ju-hsuan (王如玄), Minister of the Council of Labor Affairs; and Wang Guangmei (王光美), former First Lady of the People's Republic of China. In the Legislative Yuan, better-known alumni include Pasuya Yao (姚文智), Yao Li-ming (姚立明), Kao Jyh-peng (高志鵬), Lee Kun-tse (李昆澤), Lin Tai-hua (林岱樺), Wu Cherng-dean (吳成典), Huang Sue-ying (黃淑英), and Walis Perin (瓦歷斯貝林).

Fu Jen has also produced a substantial number of diplomats and international public servants. Its alumni have included Tien Chung-kwang (田中光), Deputy Minister of Foreign Affairs and former Representative to India; Kuan Yung (關勇), former Vice Minister of Foreign Affairs and ambassador to South Africa, Saudi Arabia, and Costa Rica; Sa Jyh-yuan (薩支遠), former Representative to Zaire and Bahrain; Chang Ming-chung (張銘忠), former Ambassador to Burkina Faso and former Deputy Representative to the European Union and Belgium; Li Chien-yi (黎倩儀), Ambassador to Palau; Shieh Jhy-wey (謝志偉), Taiwan's representative to Germany; and Jim Brown, also known as James W. Brown, interpreter for seven U.S. presidents and longtime language adviser to the U.S. ambassador to China.

Fu Jen alumni have likewise been active in law and the judiciary. Notable jurists include Lo Chang-fa (羅昌發), Justice of the Constitutional Court and former dean of the College of Law of National Taiwan University; Tsai Ching-yu (蔡清遊), Justice of the Constitutional Court; and Lin Chun-yi (林俊益), Justice of the Constitutional Court. More broadly, the university's alumni lists and public records place Fu Jen graduates across legal scholarship, judicial service, communications regulation, and public administration, including figures such as Liou Tzong-der (劉宗德) of the National Communications Commission.

=== Academia and education ===
Elite scholars who attended Fu Jen Catholic University

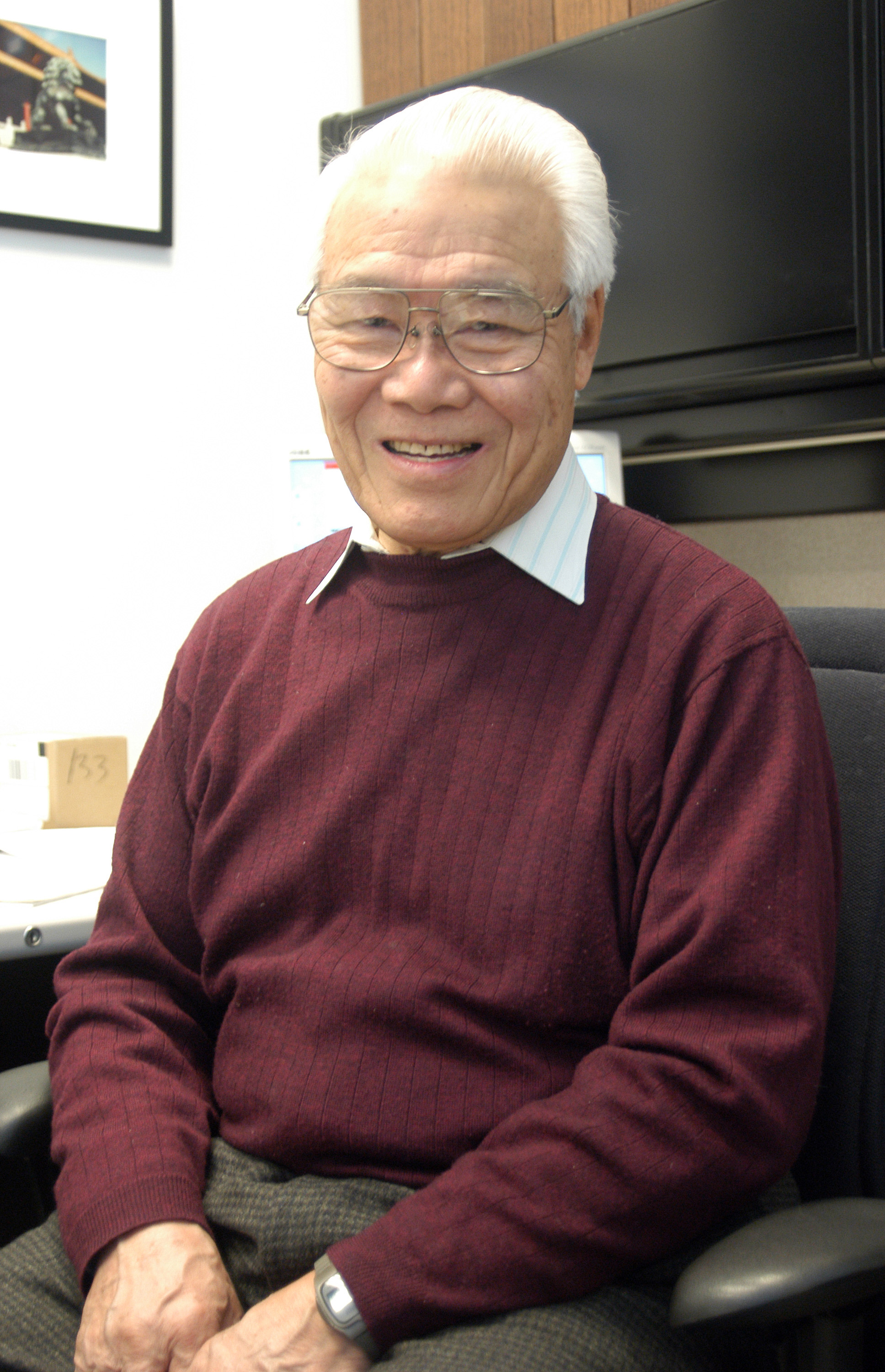
Lee C. Teng, Argonne physicist

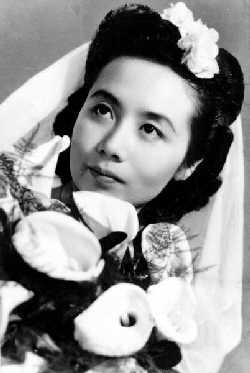
Chia-ying Yeh, UBC professor, FRSC

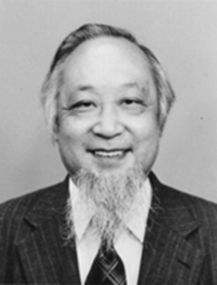
Owyang Keliang, scholar who taught at ICU Tokyo

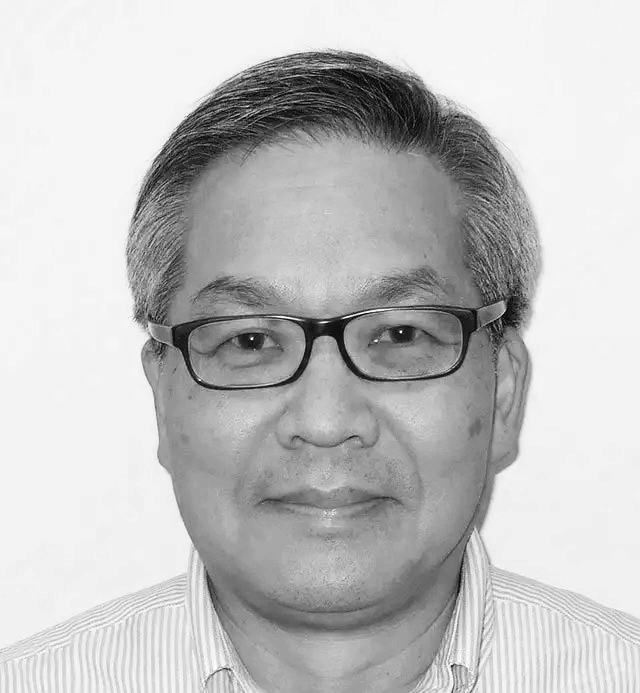
Lee-Jen Wei, Harvard professor, Wilks Memorial Award winner

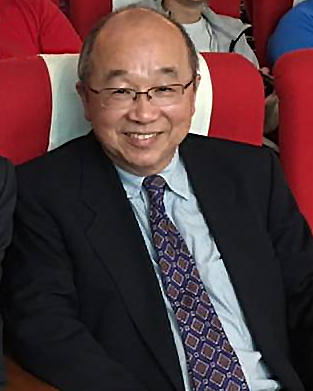
Wei-min Hao, IPCC climate scientist

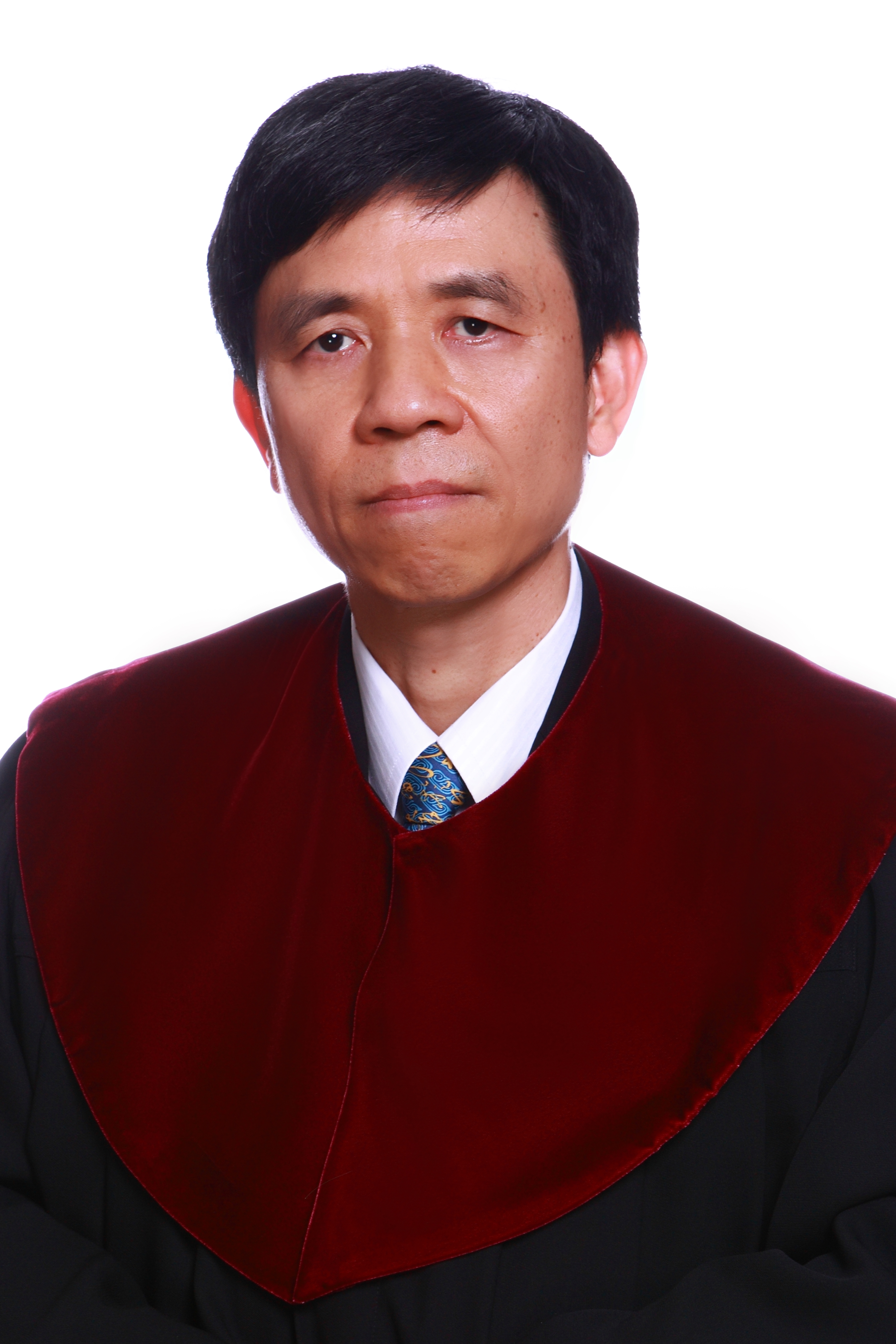
Lo Chang-fa, , National Taiwan University professor

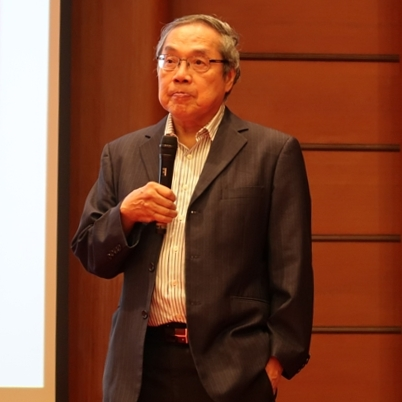
Chen Fang-ming, National Chengchi University professor

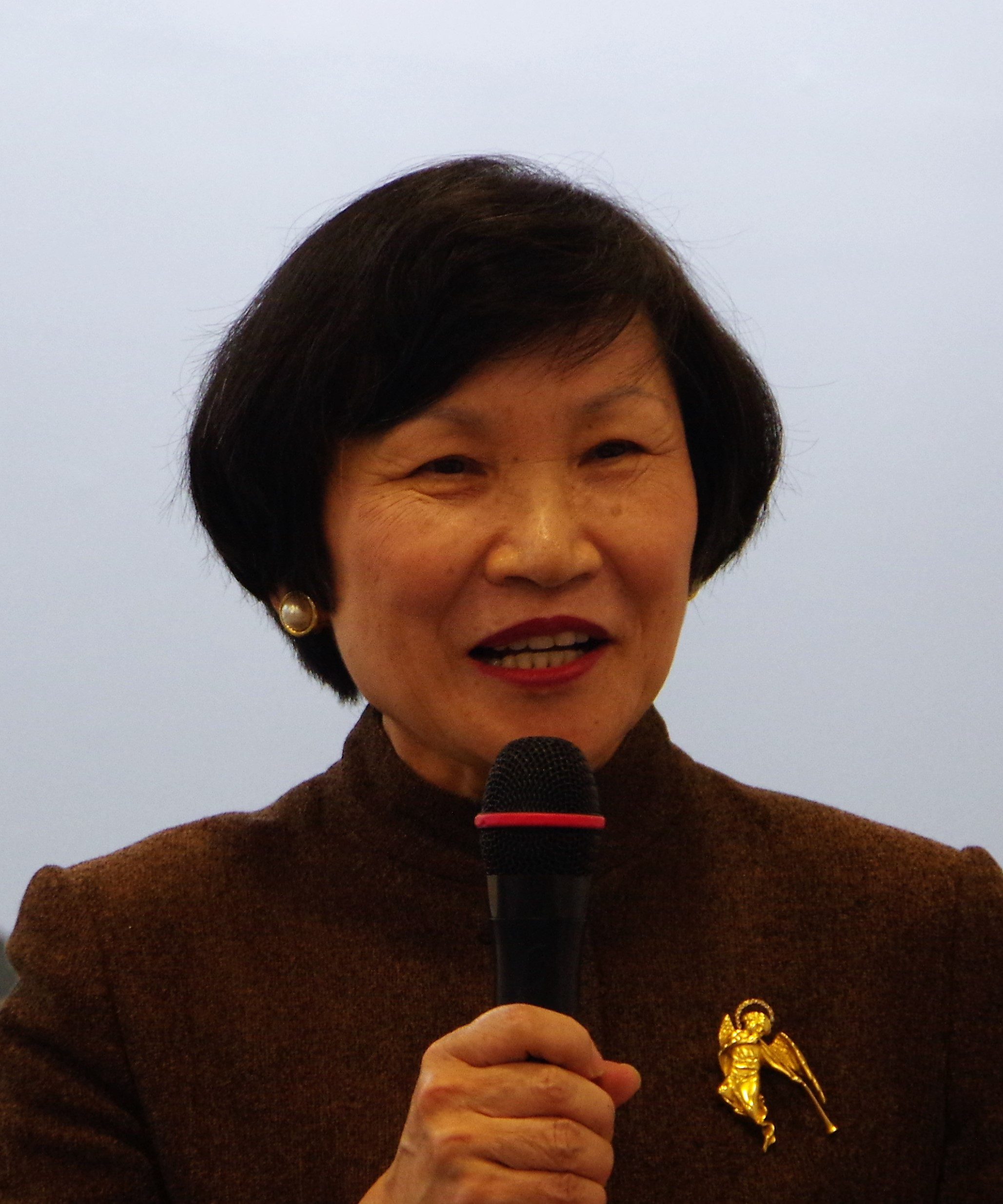
Chou Kung-shin, director of National Palace Museum

Fu Jen Catholic University has produced numerous scholars, scientists, and academic leaders in Taiwan and abroad. Among the best-known are Wei-min Hao (郝慰民), climate scientist and contributor to the Intergovernmental Panel on Climate Change (IPCC); Lee-Jen Wei (魏立人), professor at Harvard; Chi-ming Hou (侯繼明), economist affiliated with Harvard, Colgate, and the Brookings Institution; James J. Y. Liu (劉若愚), scholar who taught at Stanford; Francis L. K. Hsu (許烺光), anthropologist who taught at Columbia, Cornell, and Northwestern, and served as president of the American Anthropological Association; Esther H. Chang (張惠平), professor at the Georgetown Lombardi Cancer Center; Sung-lan Hsia (夏松瀾), professor at Miami University; Kuo-chu Ho (何國柱), physicist associated with the UChicago and professor at the UFL and Nankai University; Lee C. Teng (鄧昌黎), physicist and academician of Academia Sinica; Li Dongying (李東英), one of the founders of China's rare metal industry; Chang Bei-Dwo (張北鐸), senior director of F-15 Air Flight Programs at Raytheon Company; Kung Tse-yun (龔則韞), biologist; and Alice Chien Chang (錢嘉韻), molecular biologist and neuroscientist whose early work on thermostable DNA polymerase helped lay an important technical foundation for the later development of PCR.

In the humanities and related academic fields, notable alumni include Chia-ying Yeh (葉嘉瑩), classical Chinese literature scholar; Chou Kung-shin (周功鑫), archaeologist and former Director of the National Palace Museum; and Leopold Leeb (雷立柏), Austrian sinologist at Renmin University.

Fu Jen alumni have also included a substantial number of university heads and senior academic administrators. These include Emily Y. Ashworth (楊蓉珍) of Texas A&M University; Liu Da (劉達) of Tsinghua University and USTC; Bernard Li (黎建球) of Fu Jen Catholic University; Hou Chong-wen (侯崇文) of National Taipei University; Chin-Peng Chu (朱景鵬) of National Dong Hwa University; Ting-ming Lai (賴鼎銘) of Shih Hsin University; Chi-Yeh Yung (容繼業) of NKUHT; Suen-Zone Lee (李孫榮) of CNU; Li Yuguang (李裕光) of INTI International University; Pao-Long Chang (張保隆) of Feng Chia University. In addition, Hung Tsung-min (洪聰敏) is chair professor at National Taiwan Normal University and fellow of the U.S. National Academy of Kinesiology.

=== Business and industry ===
Notable businessman and entrepreneurs who attended Fu Jen Catholic University

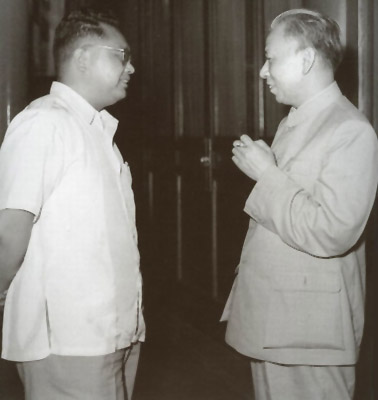
Wang Guangying, founder of China Everbright Group

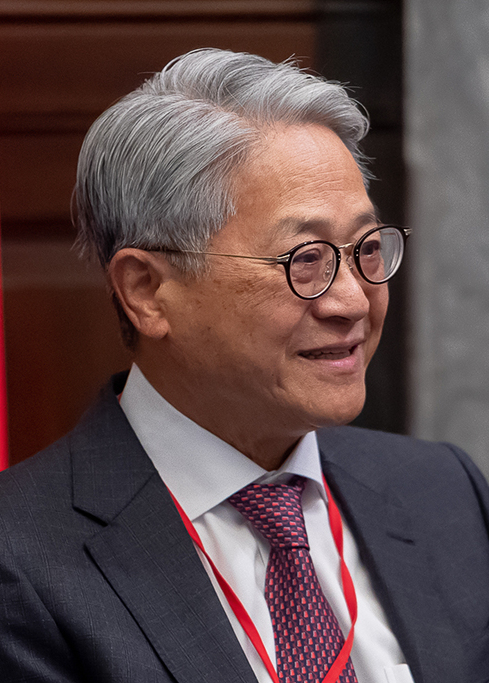
Thomas Wu, chairman of TS Financial Holdings

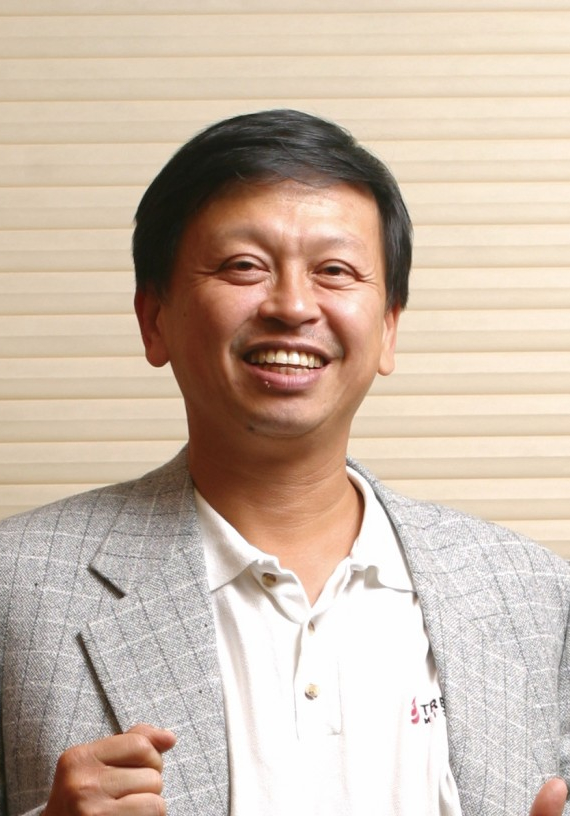
Steve Chang, co-founder and CEO of Trend Micro

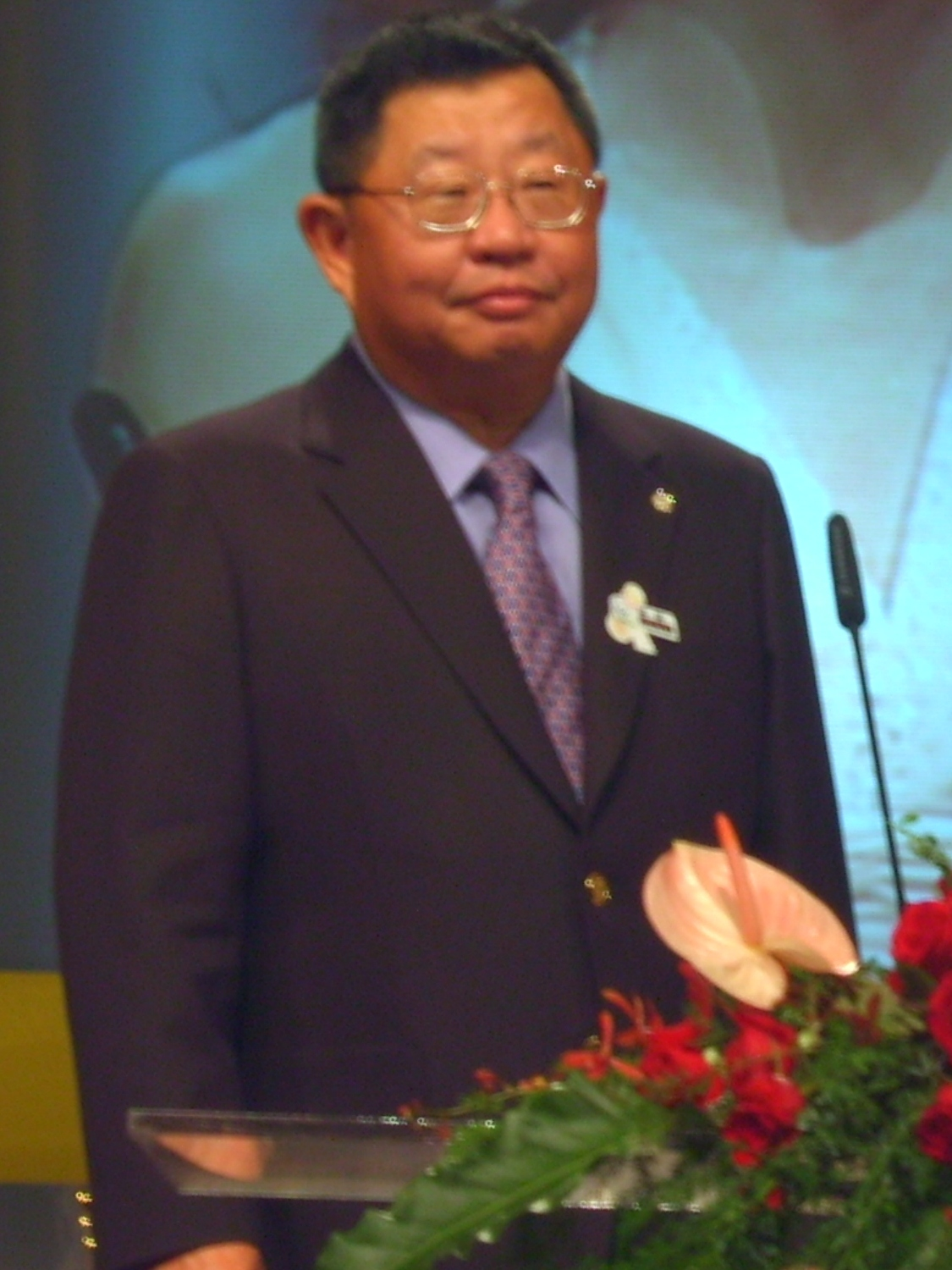
Thomas Tsai, entrepreneur of LinYuan Group

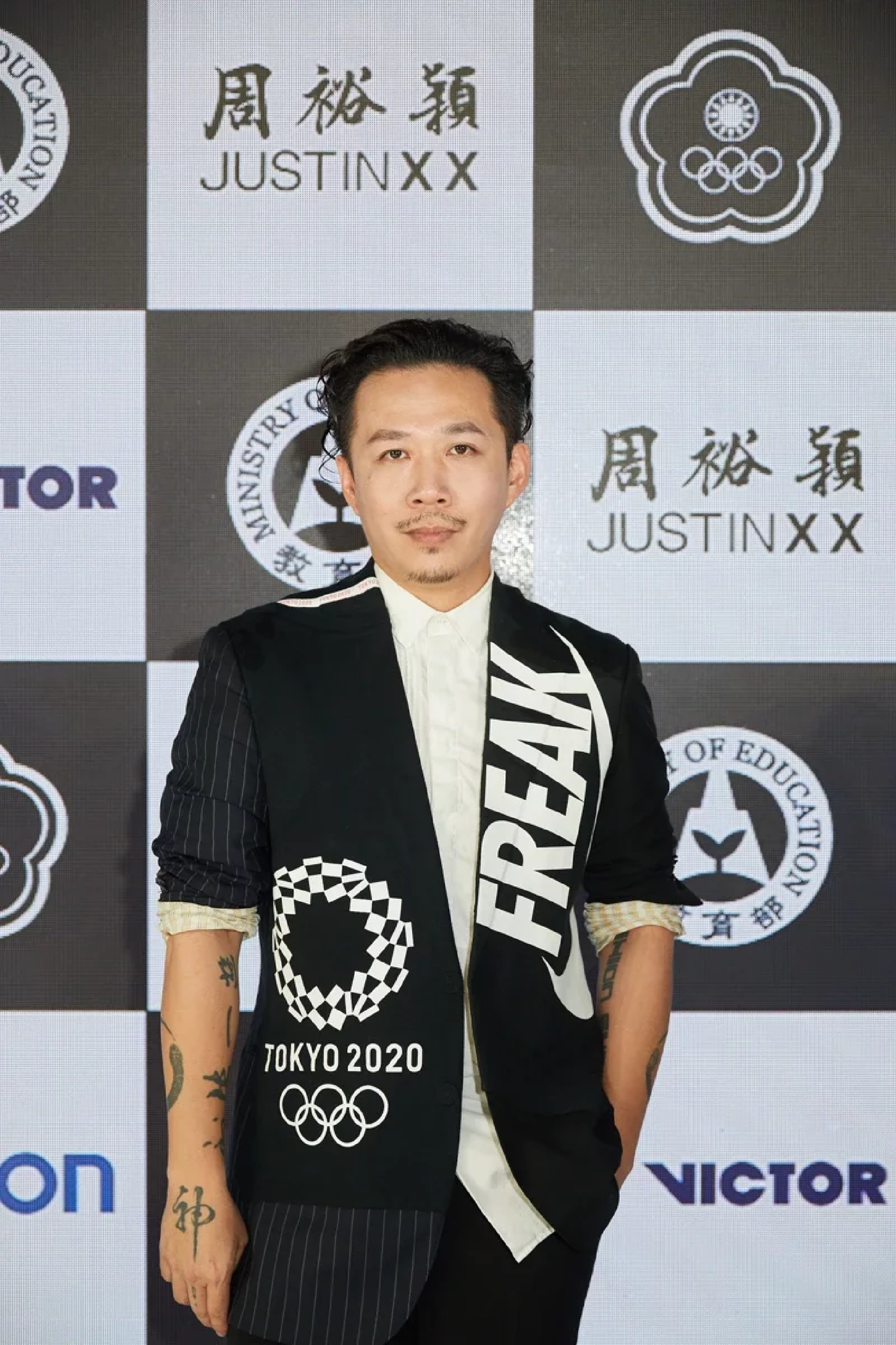
Justin Chou, founder of the fashion brands JUST IN XX and Luxxury Godbage

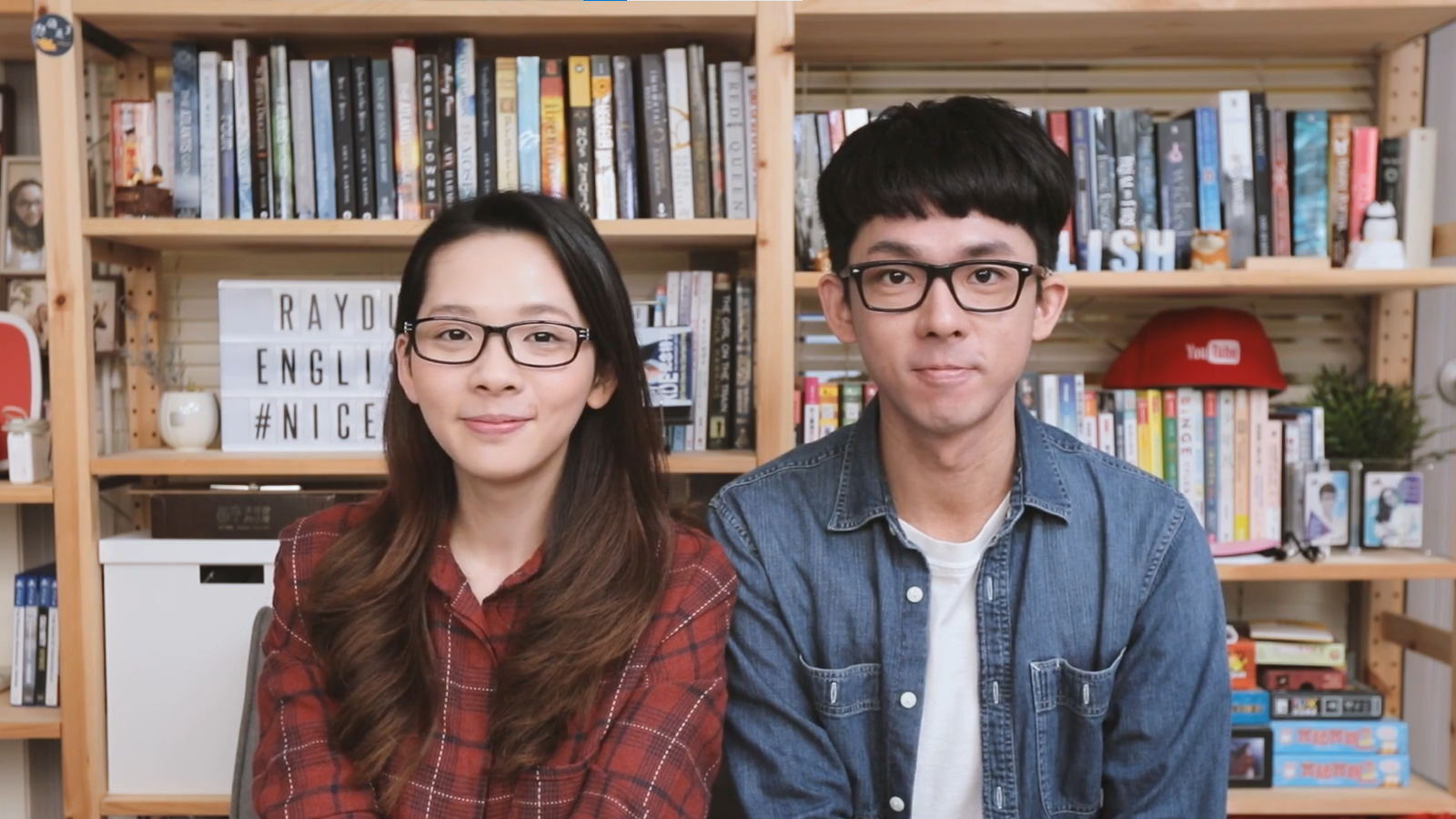
Ray Du English, entrepreneur and Youtuber

Fu Jen Catholic University has produced numerous business leaders, entrepreneurs, and industrialists in Taiwan and abroad. Among the best-known are Wang Guangying (王光英), businessman and politician; Thomas Wu (吳東亮), chairman of TS Financial Holdings; Peter Wu (吳東賢), chief executive officer of Shinkong Insurance; Tsai Chen-hung (蔡辰鴻), chief executive officer of Cathay Real Estate Development; Thomas Tsai (蔡辰威) of the LinYuan Group; Steve Chang (張明正), co-founder and former chairman and chief executive officer of Trend Micro; Carolyn Yeh (葉紫華), co-founder of Acer Inc.; Maverick Shih (施宣輝), board member of Acer; Cheng Fu-Tien (鄭福田) and Simon Y. H. Tsuo (左元淮), co-founders of Motech Industries; Franz Chen (陳立恆), founder of Franz-porcelains; Tony Ho (何湯雄), co-founder of Test Rite International; Peter Lo (羅崑泉), founder of Johnson Health Tech; and Charles C. Y. Chen (陳致遠), chairman of Epistar and a member of the Wan Hai Lines family.

The university's distinguished alumni records also show a long-running presence in industry, finance, trade, and corporate management. Alumni recognized in the category of business and industry include Tai Tse-kang (戴澤康), Su Chien-hua (蘇建華), Chang Tsai-yu (張財育), Sun Ta-wen (孫達汶), Chang Wen-tan (張文潭), Ho Han-yeh (何漢業), Hsieh Jung-kun (謝榮坤), Chang Cheng Mei-lien (張鄭美蓮), vice chair of BizLink Holding; Fu Pei-fang (傅佩芳), chair of Fanglun; and Lee Chi-li (李其澧), chair of Yung Shin Pharmaceutical Industrial.

=== Literature, media, and entertainment ===
Cultural elites who attended Fu Jen Catholic University

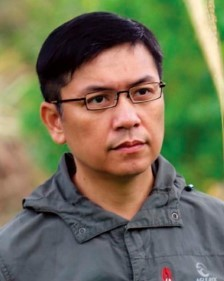
Wu Ming-yi, Man Booker International Prize nomination

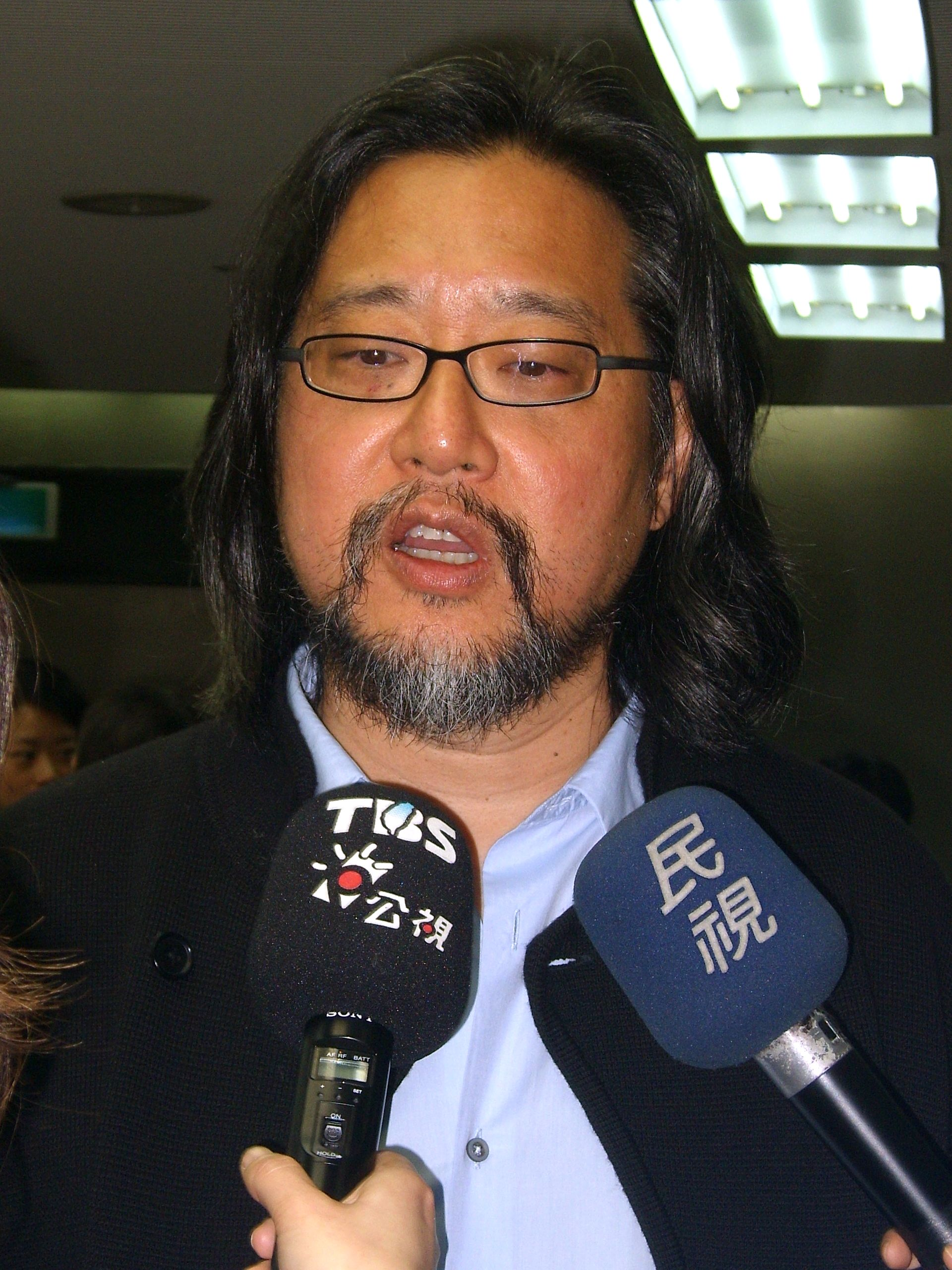
Stan Lai, notable playwright and theater director

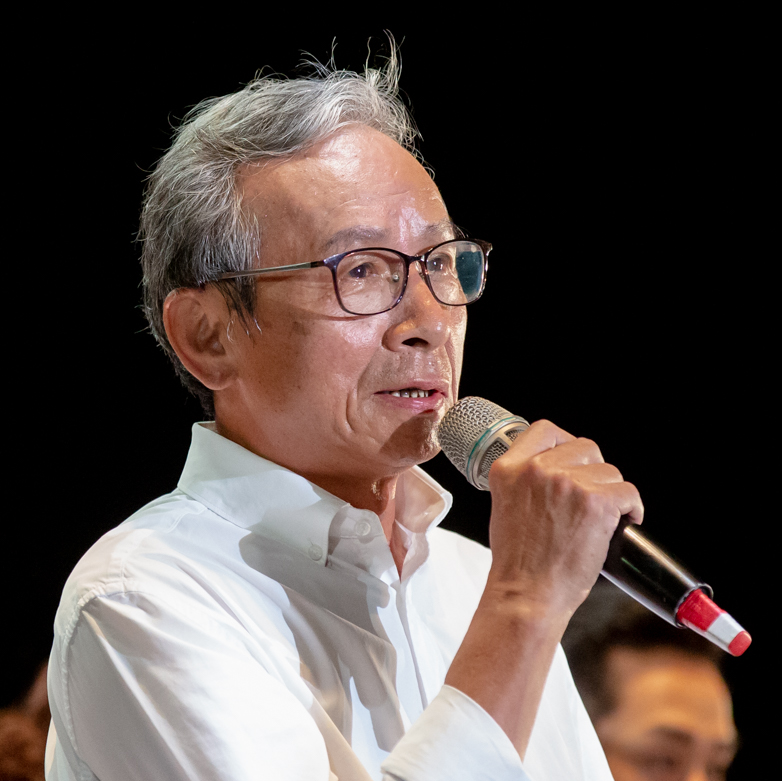
Wu Nien-jen, notable screenwriter and Golden Horse Award winner

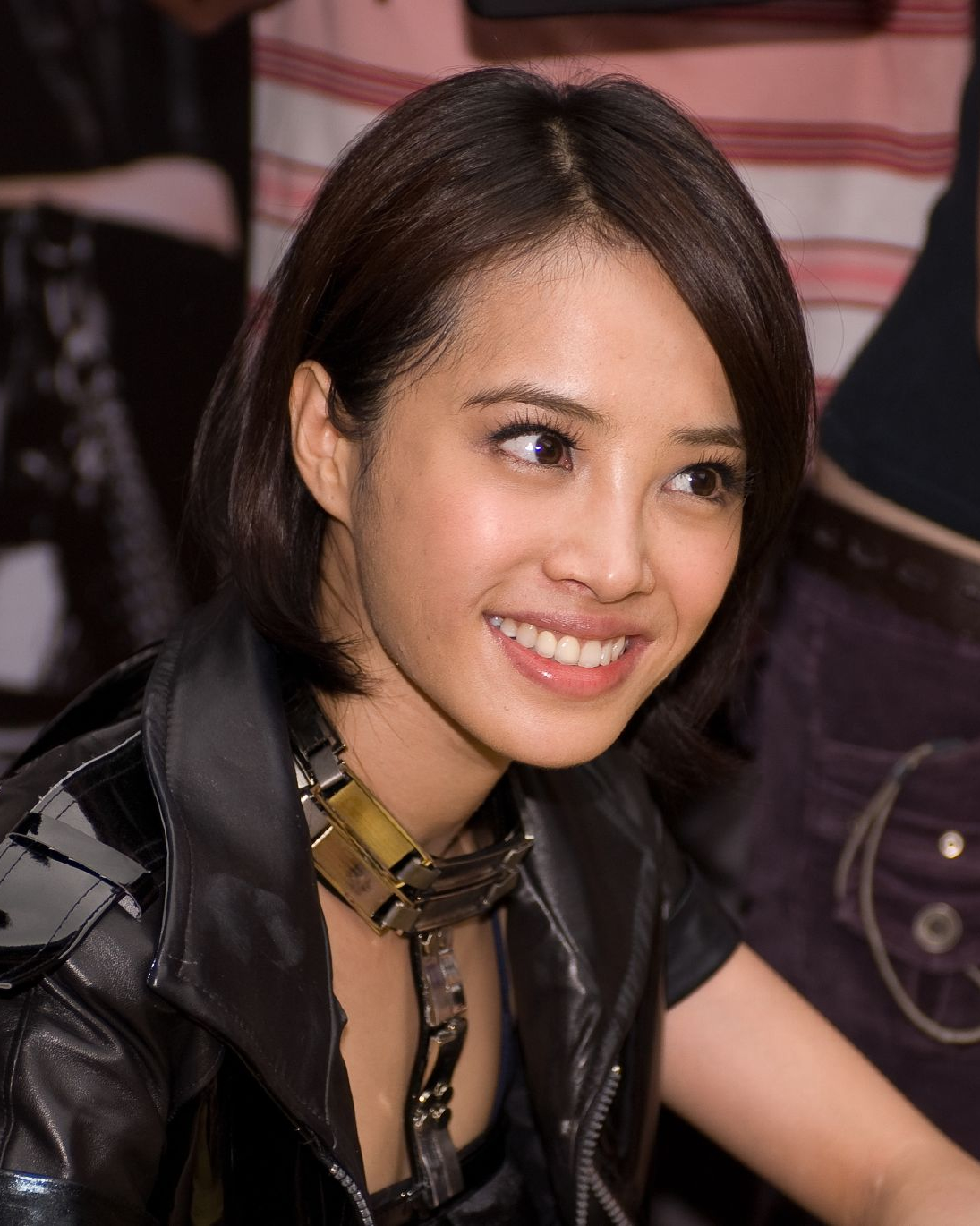
Jolin Tsai, notable singer and actress

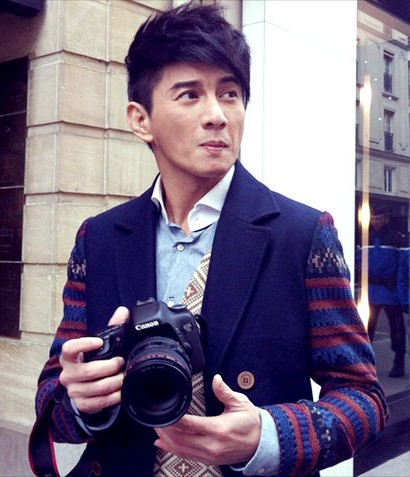
Nicky Wu, notable singer and actor

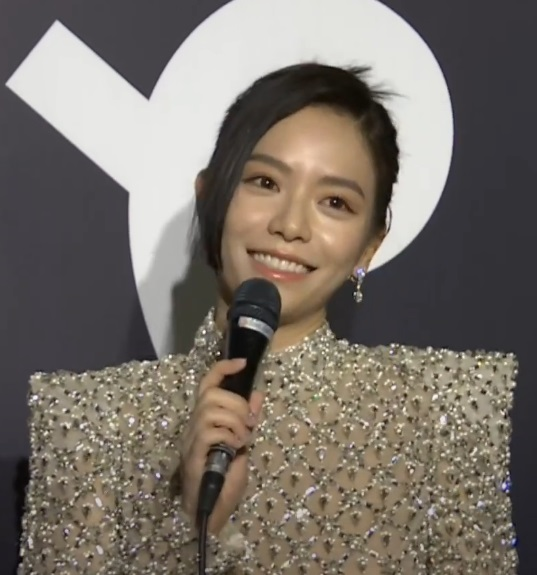
Vivian Sung, notable actress and Golden Horse Award nominee

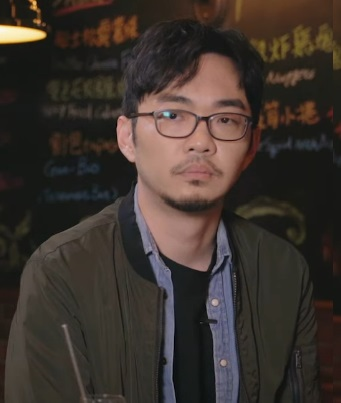
Cheng Wei-hao, film director and screenwriter

The university has also produced many writers, media figures, and entertainers, and has had a significant presence in Taiwan's cultural and popular media spheres. In literature and journalism, notable alumni include Wu Ming-yi (吳明益), writer and 2018 Man Booker International Prize nominee; Hsiao-Hung Pai (白曉紅), UK-based journalist and author; Chang Ta-chun (張大春), fiction writer and cultural commentator; Yang-Min Lin (林央敏), author and poet; Sun Ta-chuan (孫大川), writer, scholar, and public intellectual; Alfonso Wong (王澤), creator of the Old Master Q comic strip; and Lo Kii-Ming (羅基敏), musicologist and professor of musicology at National Taiwan Normal University.

In theatre, film, television, music, and popular entertainment, Fu Jen alumni include Stan Lai (賴聲川), stage director and playwright; Wu Nien-jen (吳念真), screenwriter and film director; Neil Peng (馮光遠), screenwriter and Golden Horse Award winner; Shen Chun-hua (沈春華) and Li Yen-chiu (李艷秋), television news anchors and hosts; Wu Hsiao-li (吳小莉) and Terry Hu (胡一虎), television journalists and hosts; Jolin Tsai (蔡依林), Mandopop singer; Nicky Wu (吳奇隆), actor, singer, and entrepreneur; Reen Yu (喻虹淵) and Vivian Sung (宋芸樺), actresses; Wu Ting-yu (吳庭毓), violinist and concertmaster of Taiwan's National Symphony Orchestra; MC HotDog, rapper; Hsueh Shih-ling (薛仕凌), actor and member of Da Mouth; Shone An (安鈞璨), member of Comic Boyz; Cherry Boom, whose members were all Fu Jen alumni; Faye Zhan (詹雯婷), member of F.I.R.; and Vicky Chen (陳思函), singer.

=== Sports ===
Sports elites who attended Fu Jen Catholic University

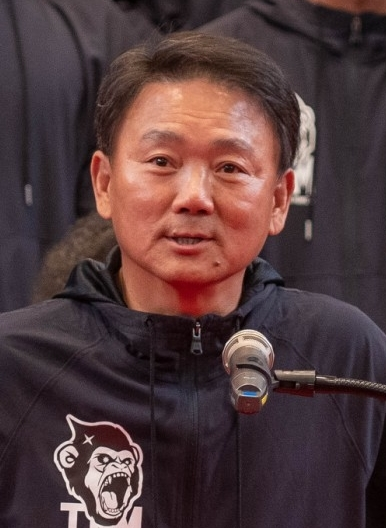
Hong I-chung, baseball catcher and manager

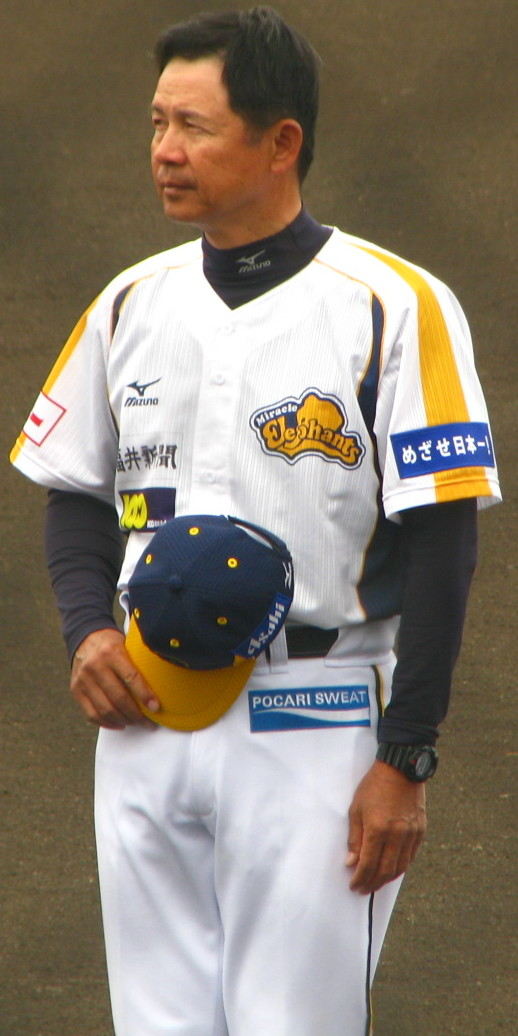
Sakamoto Yoshika, notable baseball player

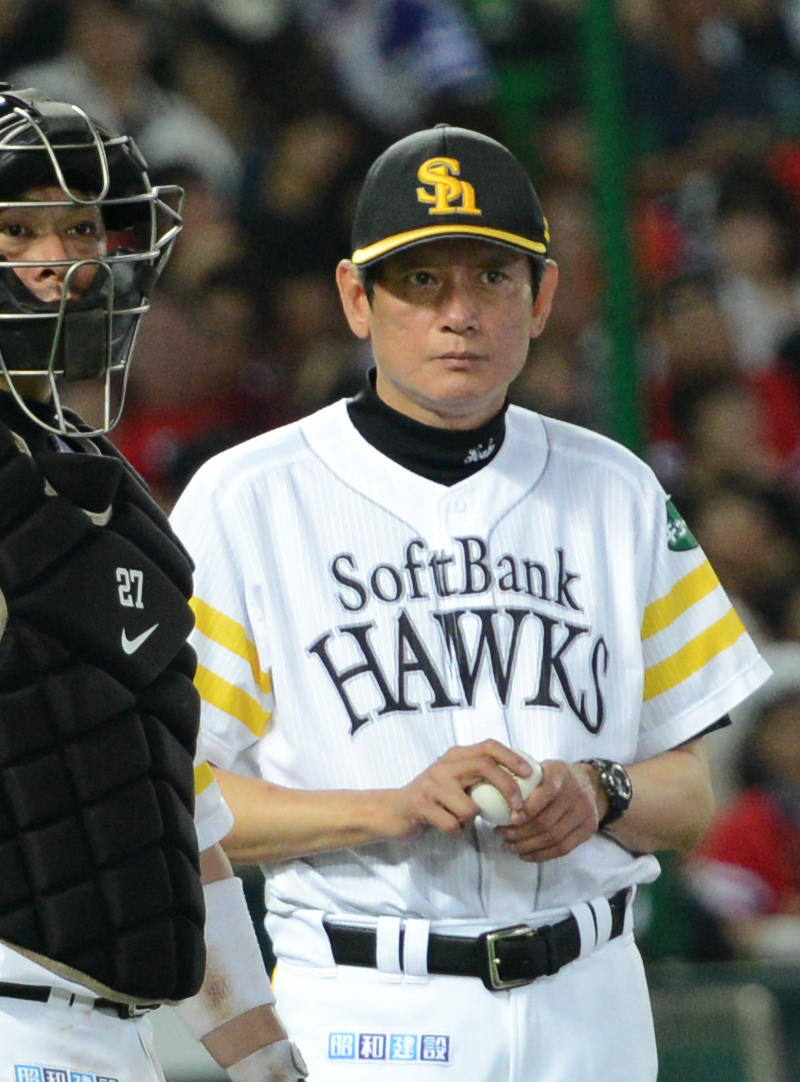
Kuo Tai-yuan, notable baseball player

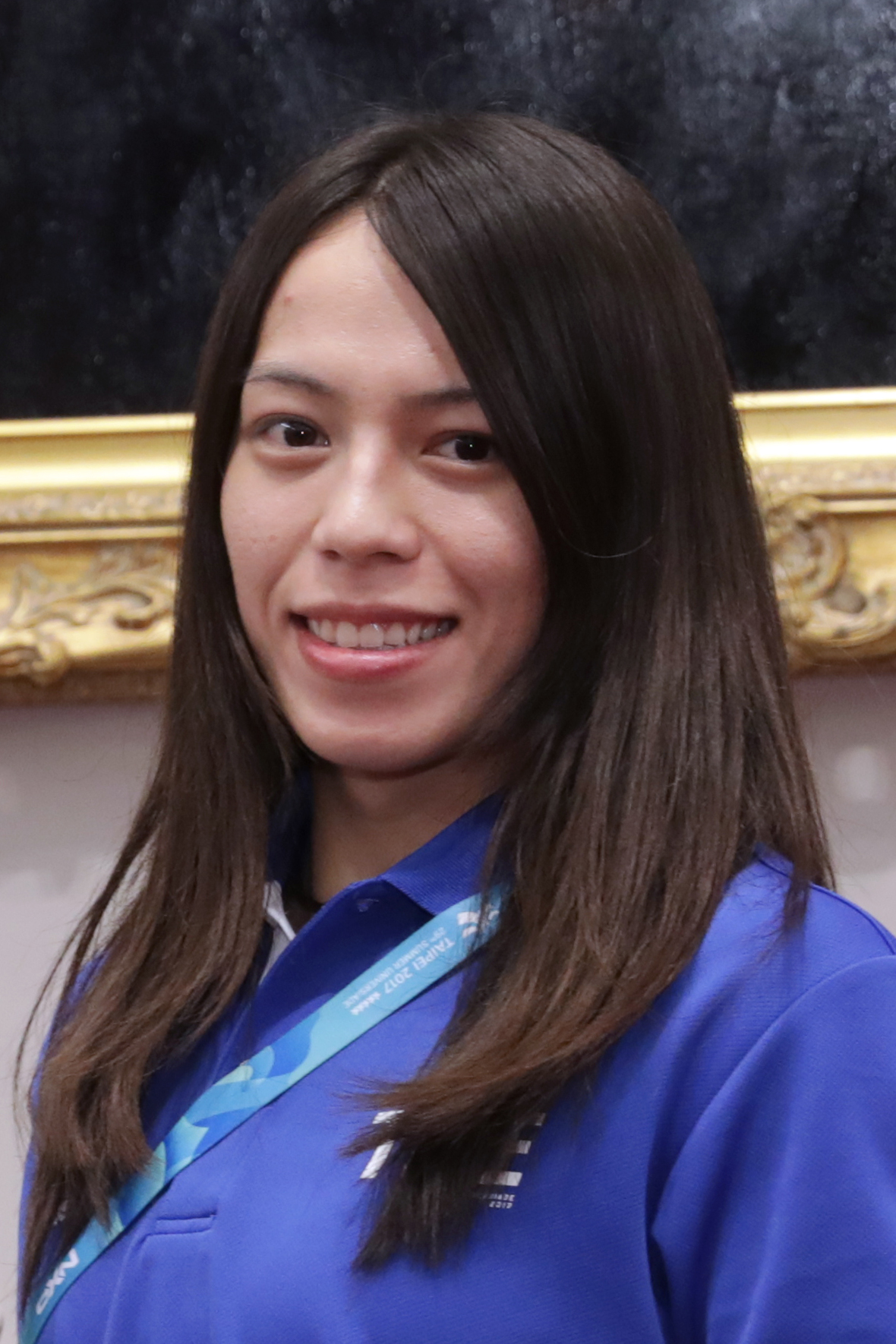
Kuo Hsing-chun, weightlifter, Olympian

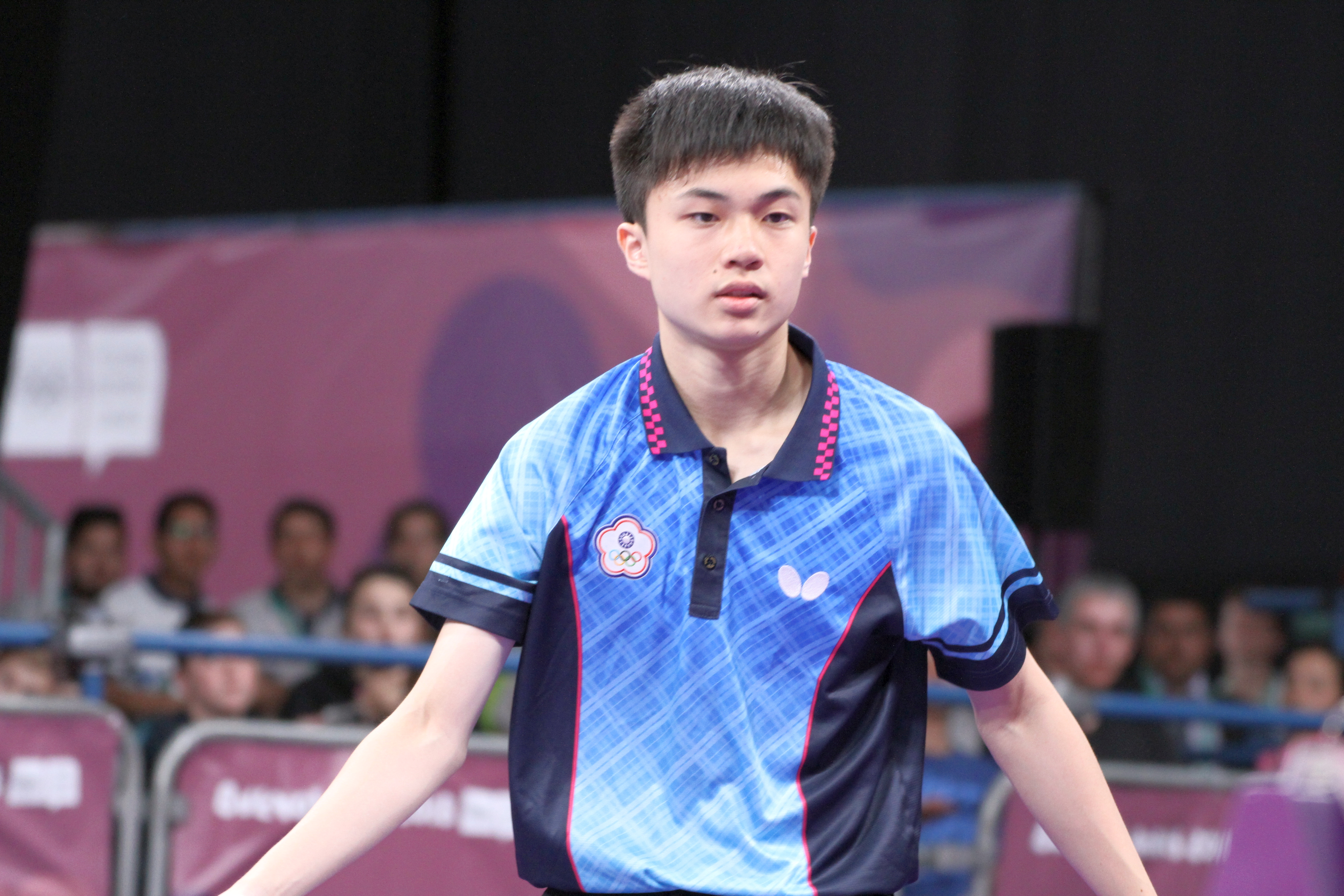
Lin Yun-ju, table tennis player, Olympian

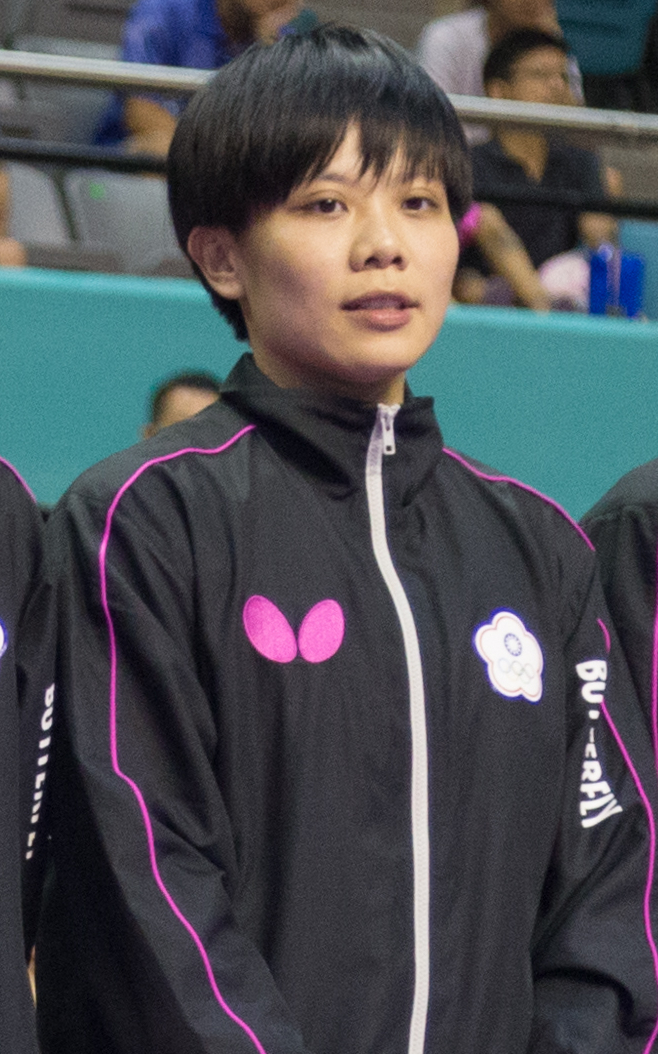
Cheng I-ching, table tennis player, Olympian

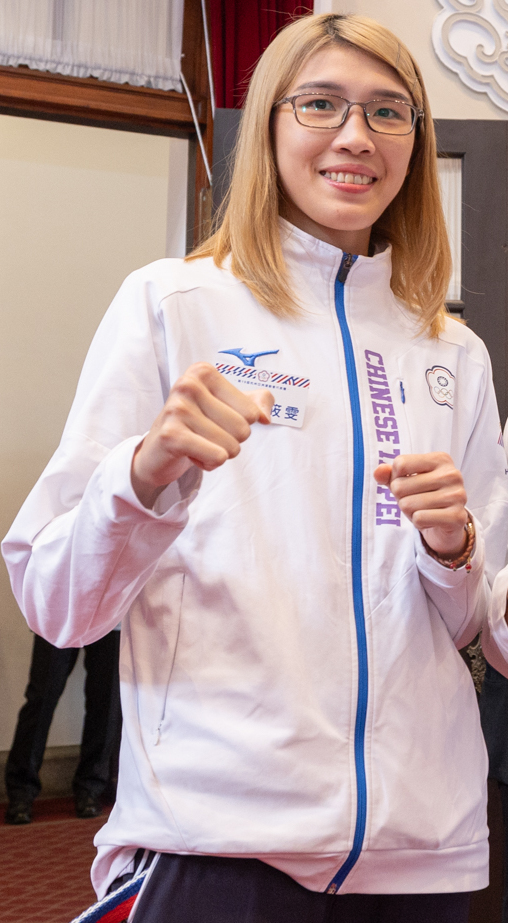
Huang Hsiao-wen, boxer, Olympian

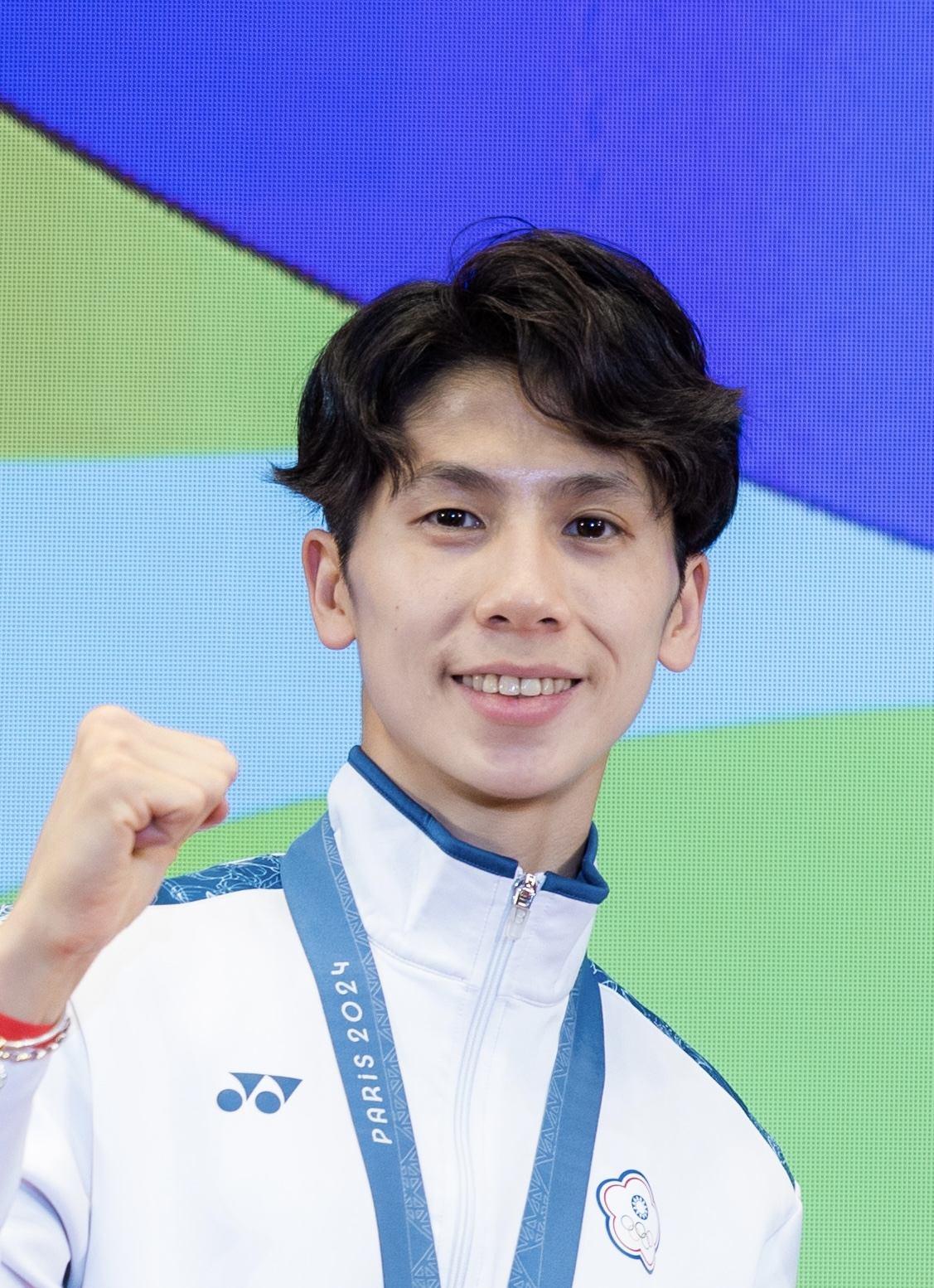
Lin Yu-ting, boxer, Olympian

Fu Jen Catholic University has also produced a number of notable athletes in baseball, football, athletics, weightlifting, rowing, boxing, and table tennis. Its alumni include Chen Chih-yuan (陳致遠), former baseball player; Pan Wei-lun (潘威倫), professional baseball pitcher; Wu Pai-ho (吳柏豪), football player; Lee Fu-an (李福恩), decathlete; Cheng Chao-tsun (鄭兆村), javelin thrower; Kuo Hsing-chun (郭婞淳), weightlifter and Olympic gold medalist; Huang Yi-ting (黃義婷), competitive rower; Lin Yun-ju (林昀儒), table tennis player; Cheng I-ching (鄭怡靜), table tennis player; Lin Yu-ting (林郁婷), boxer; and Huang Hsiao-wen (黃筱雯), boxer.

== Notable honorary doctorates ==
Fu Jen Catholic University has a special international status and plays a role in Taiwan's diplomatic status. The university has repeatedly awarded honorary doctorates to cardinals, national leaders and Nobel Prize winners.

Traditionally, the Ambassador of the R.O.C. (Taiwan) to the Holy See can earn an honorary doctorate from Fu Jen after retiring.

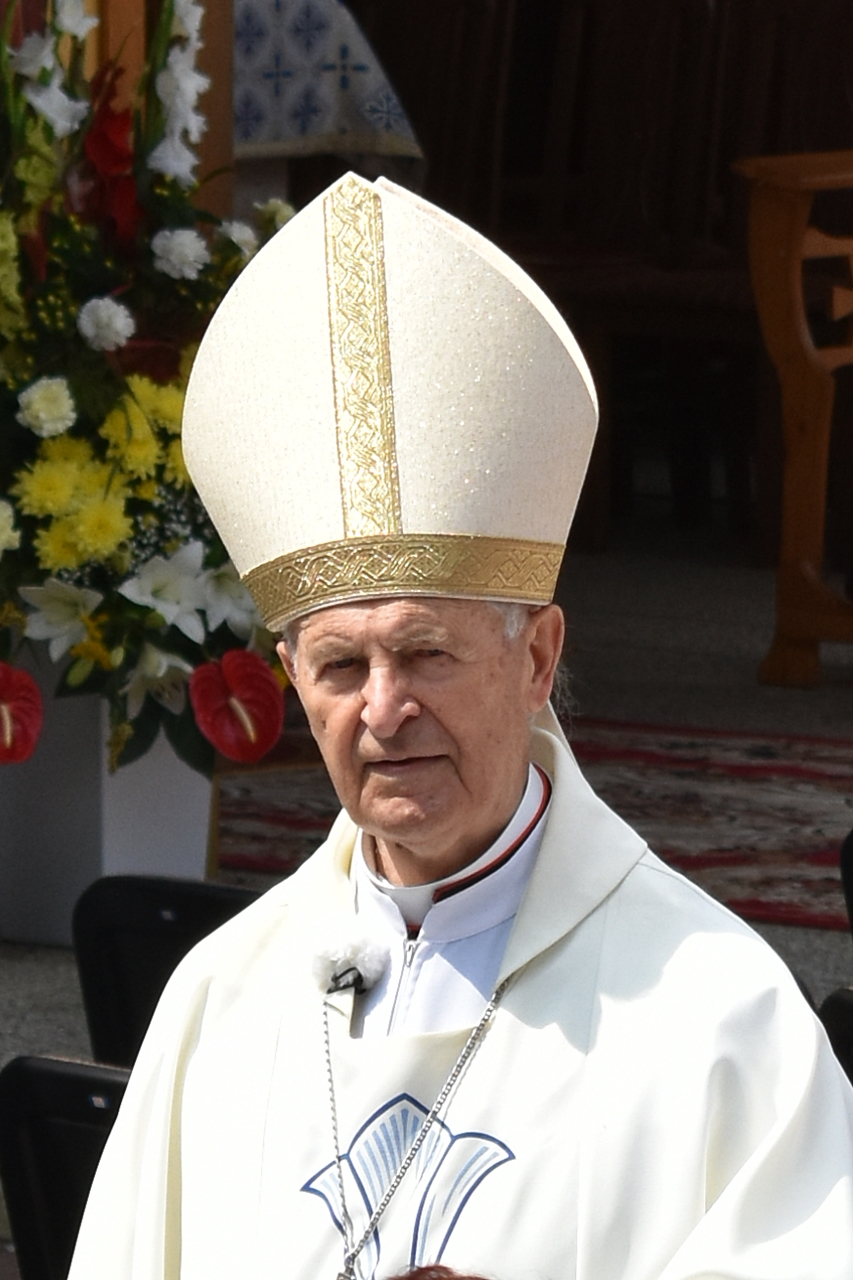
Slovak Cardinal, Jozef Tomko

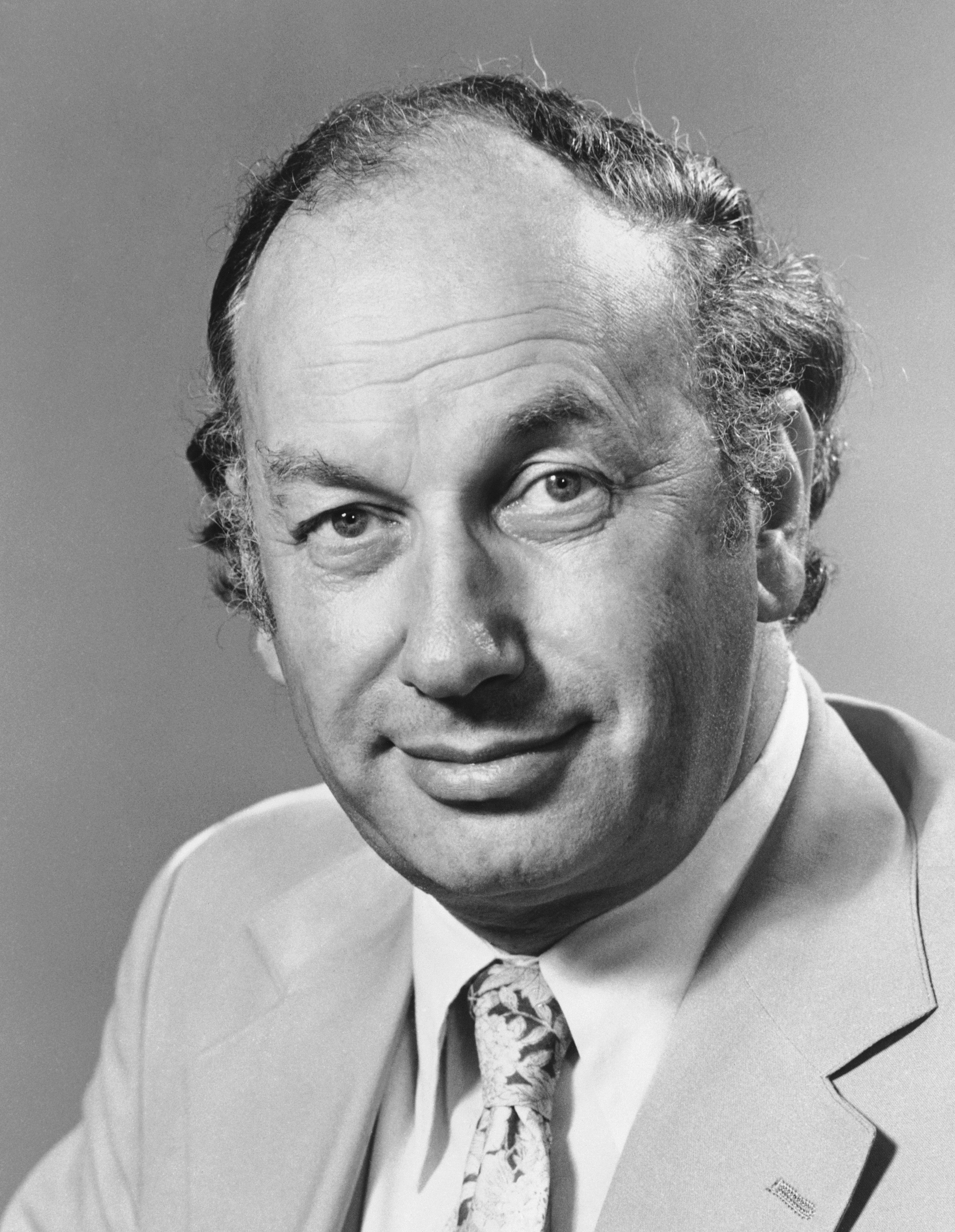
English pharmacologist, 1982 Nobel Prize in Physiology or Medicine winner John Vane

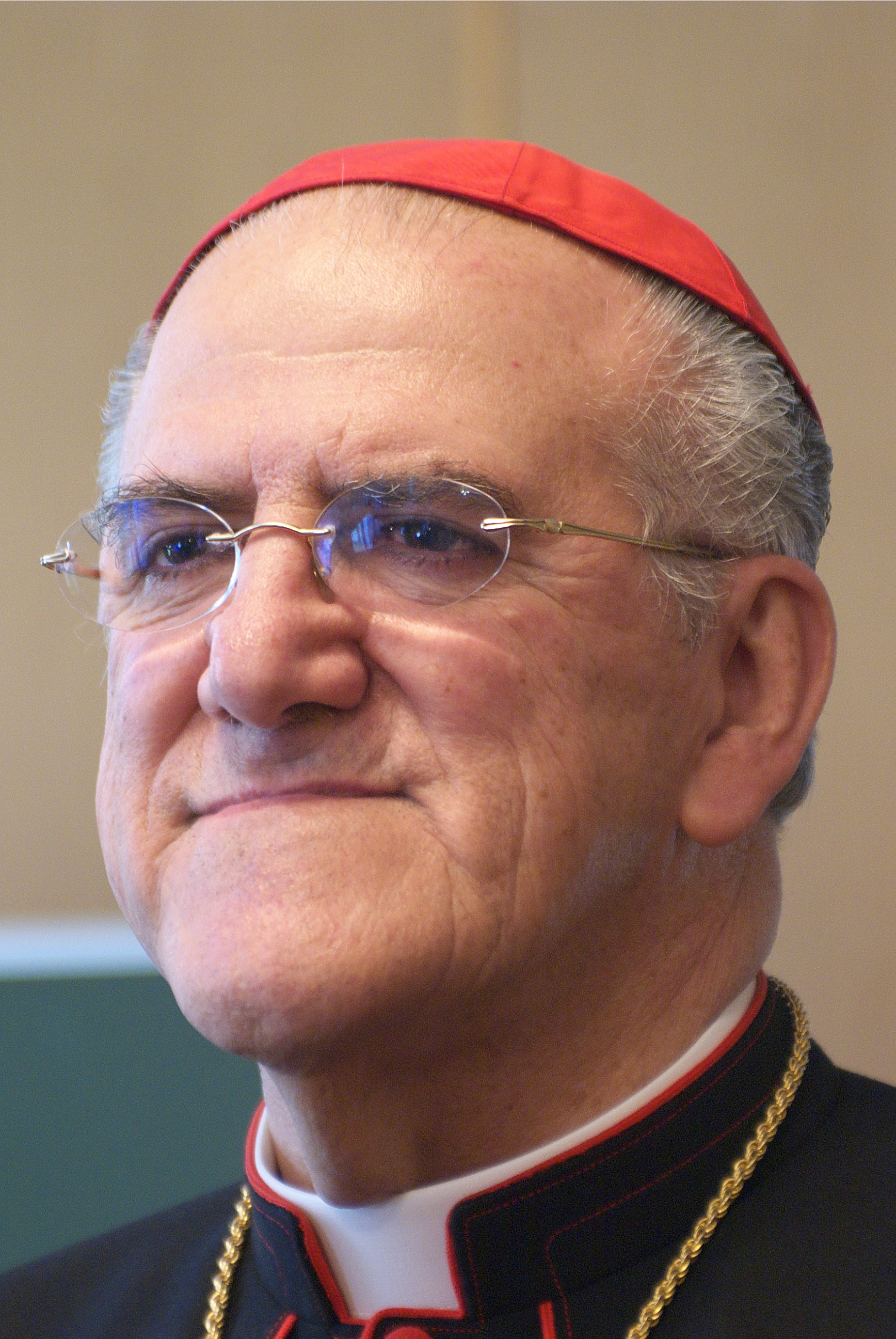
Mexican Cardinal, Javier Lozano Barragán

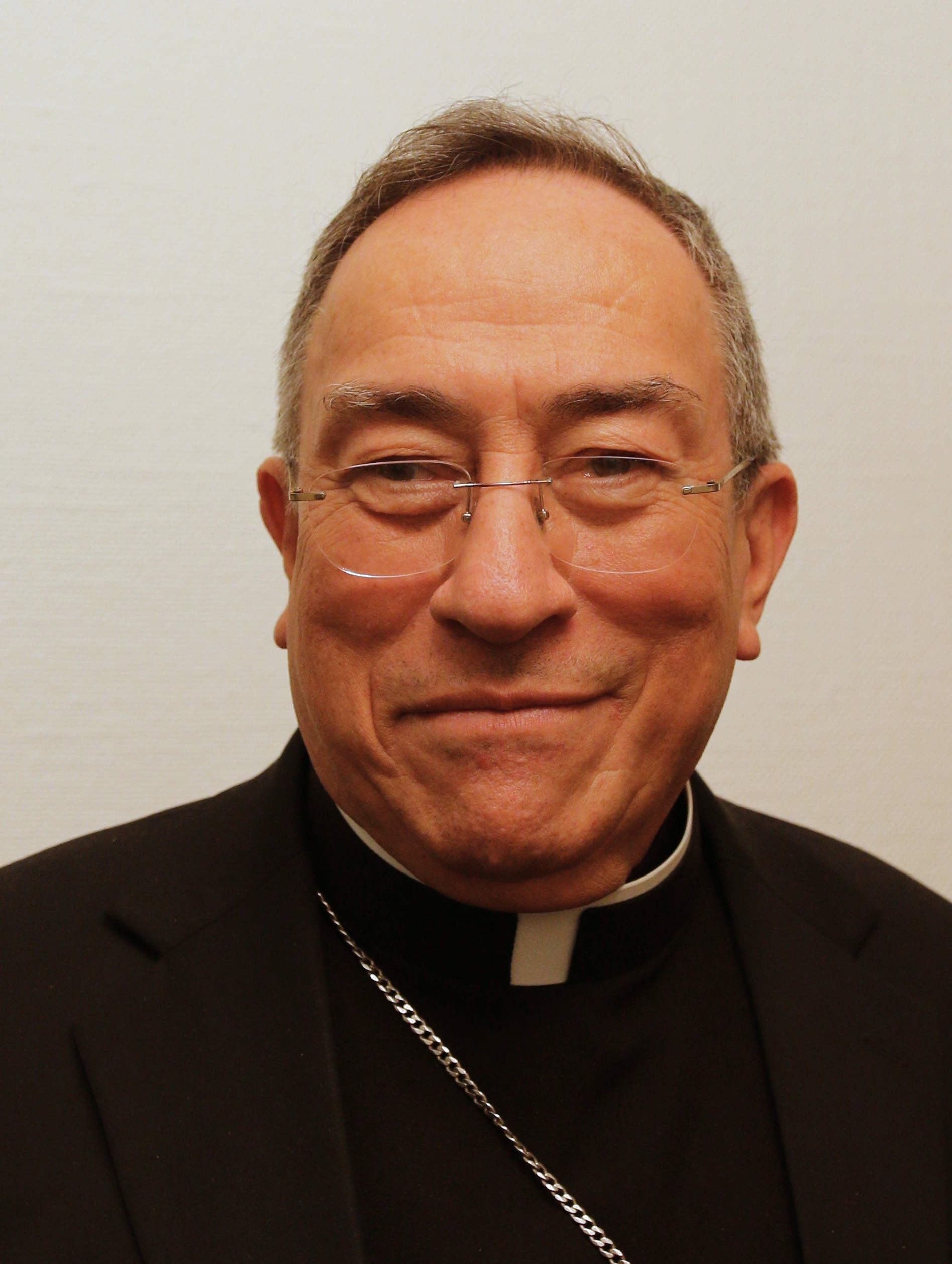
Salesian and Cardinal, Óscar Rodríguez Maradiaga

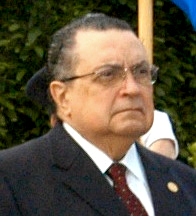
President of Costa Rica between 2002 and 2006, Abel Pacheco

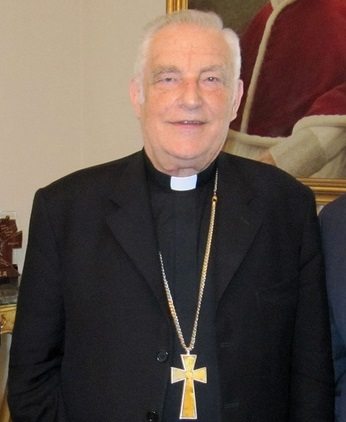
Polish-born Cardinal, Zenon Grocholewski

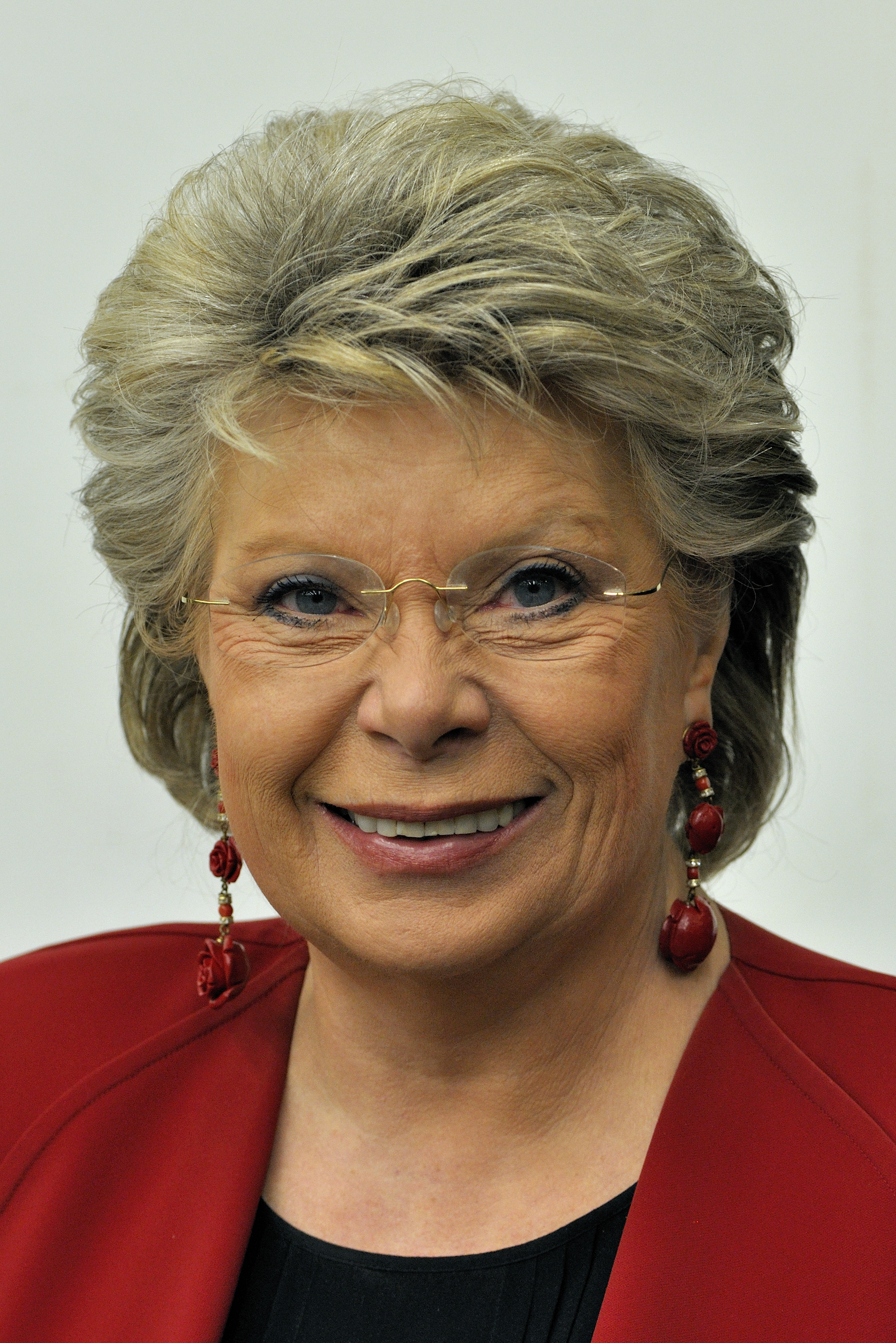
Luxembourgish politician and a former member of the European Parliament (MEP), Viviane Reding

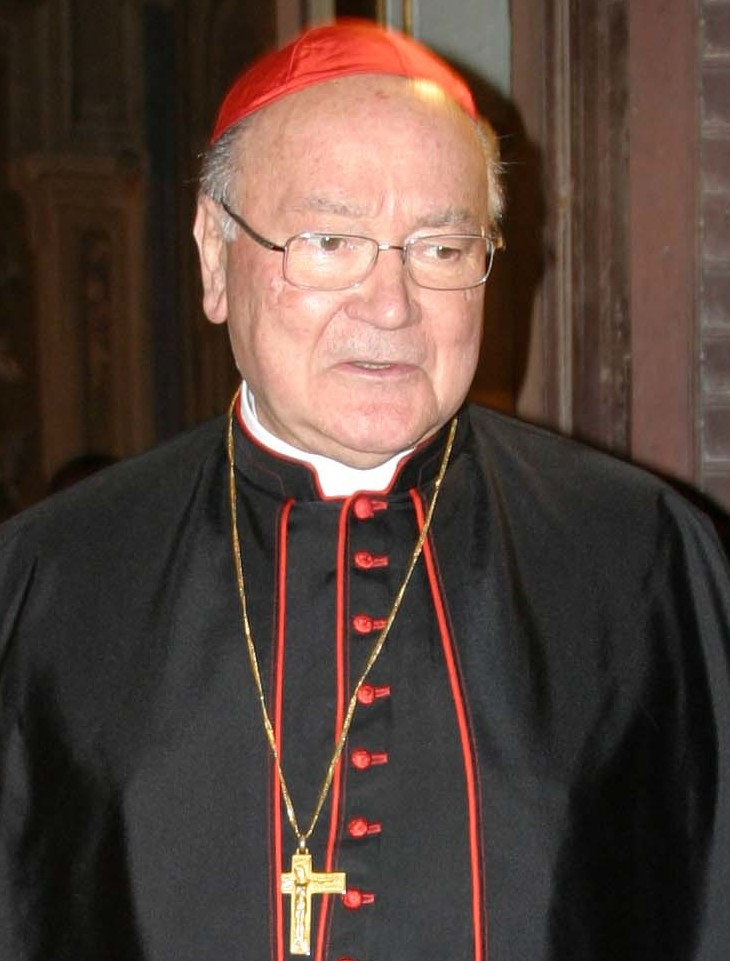
Italian Cardinal, Renato Martino

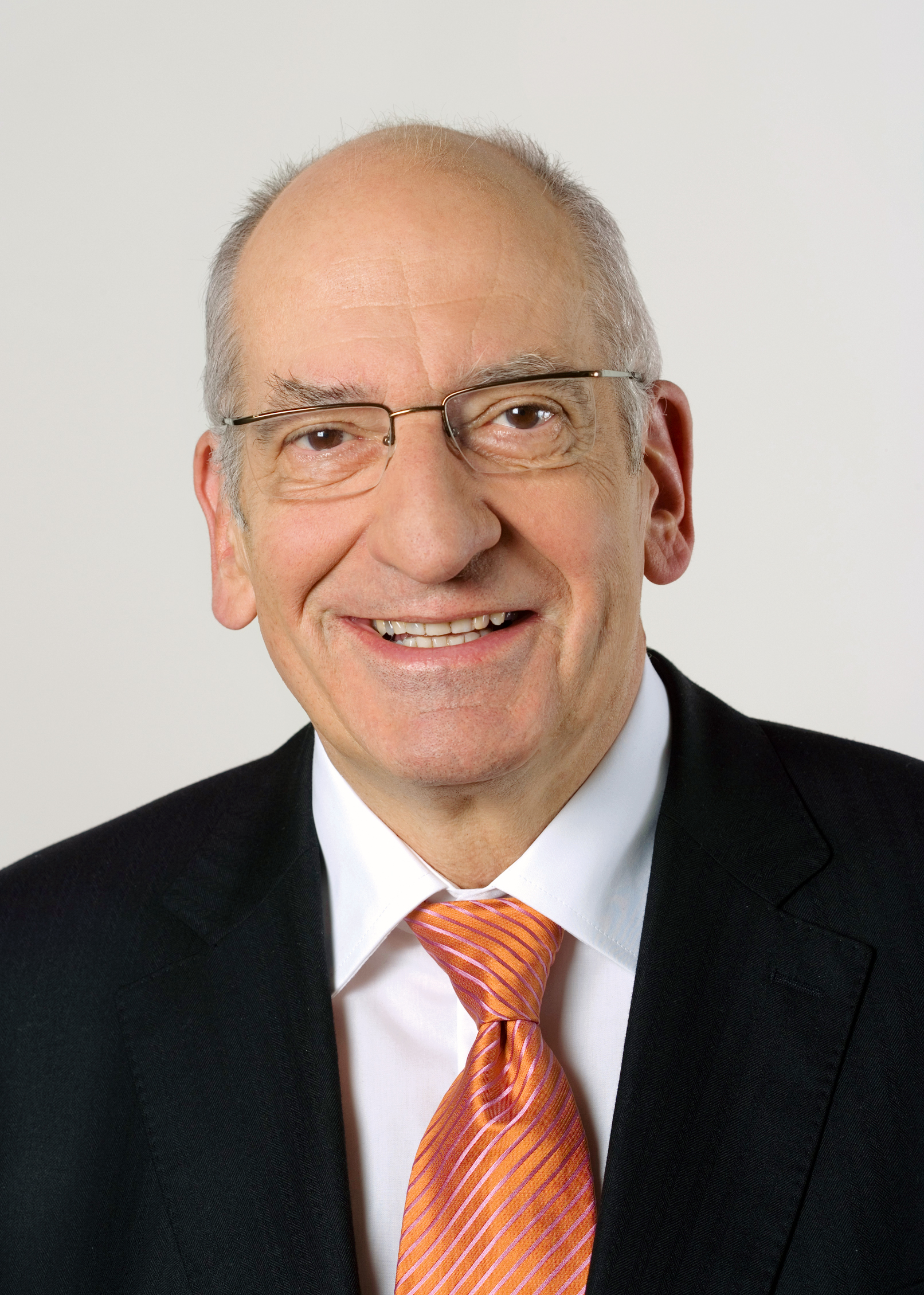
Swiss politician and a former president of the Swiss Confederation, Pascal Couchepin

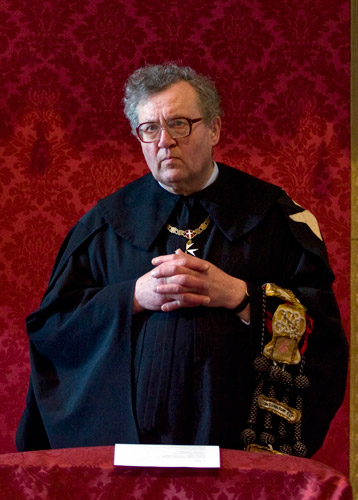
Prince and Grand Master of the Order of Malta, Matthew Festing

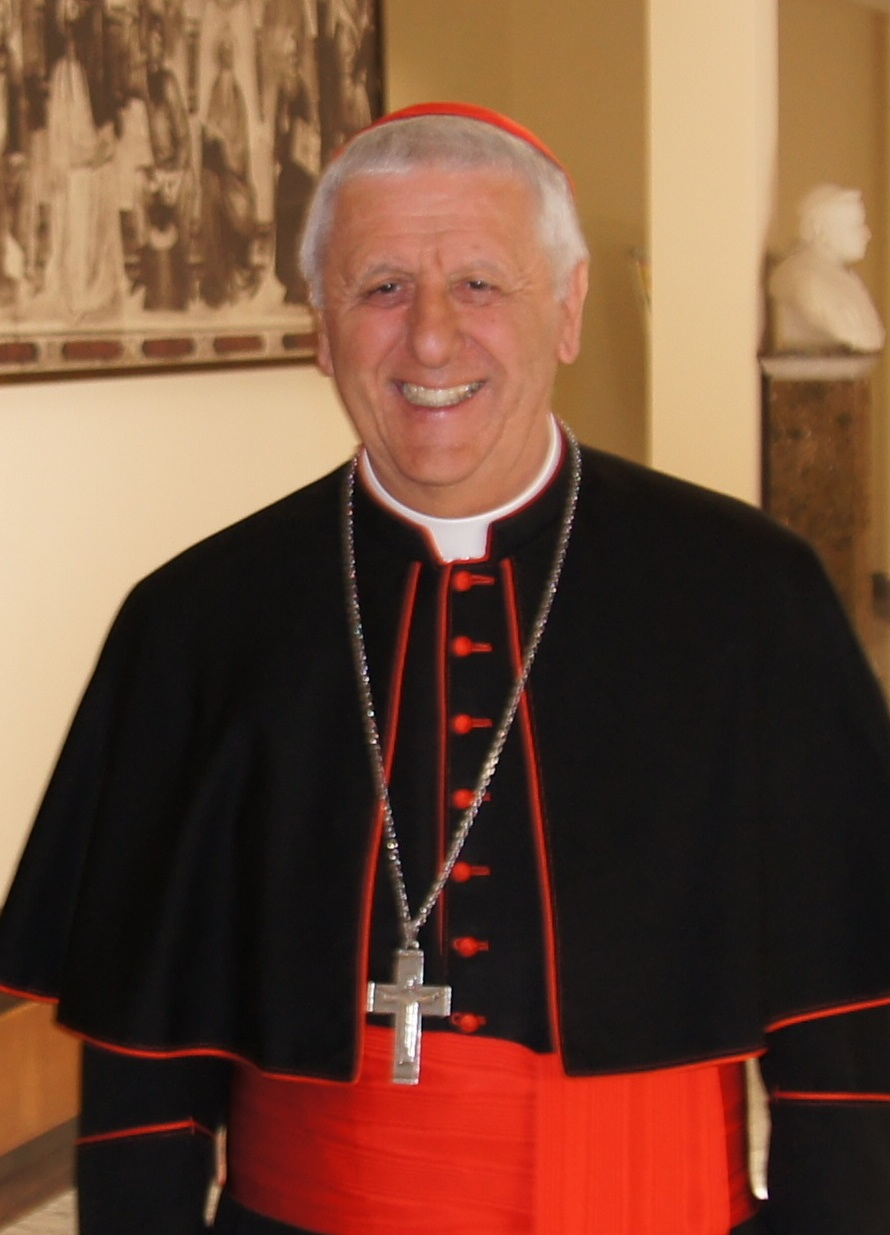
Cardinal Prefect of the Congregation for Catholic Education, Giuseppe Versaldi

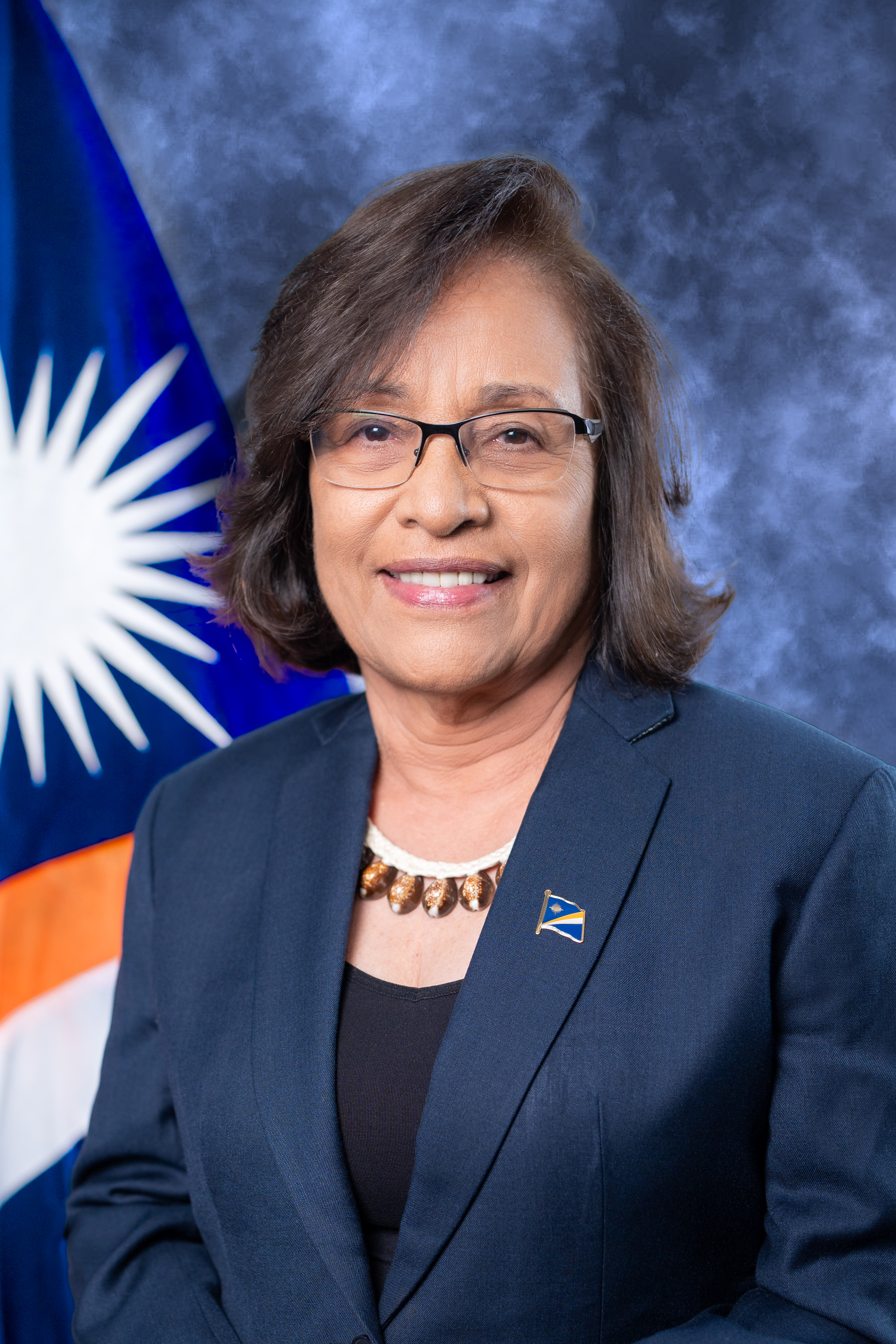
The 8th president of the Marshall Islands, Hilda Heine

== Affiliated schools ==
- Keelung Fu Jen Sacred Heart Senior High School (輔大聖心高中), Keelung City, Taiwan
- Keelung Fu Jen Sacred Heart Elementary School (輔大聖心小學), Keelung City, Taiwan

== Controversy ==
In 2016, Fu Jen University was accused of pressuring students to remain silent on sexual assault cases and for covering up an incident of rape in 2015. Following the accusation, the university issued an apology later in 2016.

== Partner institution ==
=== Founder and church ===
- Order of Saint Benedict (Beijing period)
- Roman Catholicism in Taiwan
- Republic of China–Holy See relations

=== Alliance ===
- Alliance of Asian Liberal Arts Universities
- Association of Christian Universities and Colleges in Asia
- EUTW university alliance
- Excellent Long-Established University Consortium of Taiwan
- International Federation of Catholic Universities
- Tsinghua Big Five Alliance
- University Mobility in Asia and the Pacific
- United Board for Christian Higher Education in Asia

== See also ==
- Hang Yuen FC
- Instruction in Latin#Curriculum requirements in Asia
- List of schools in the Republic of China reopened in Taiwan
- List of Jesuit educational institutions
- List of Jesuit sites
- List of schools of landscape architecture
- List of university and college schools of music
- List of fashion education programs
