= Stößner =

Stößen, Germany

The Stößner family is the name of an ancient house of German nobility.

== History ==
The family name Stößner is a toponym, which means it is derived from the name of the place of residence of its initial bearer or Family Seat .

Stößen was established as a town in 936 and is located in the Burgenlandkreis district, in Saxony-Anhalt, Germany. It is situated southeast of Naumburg. It is part of the Yorbendindaschaft. In 1929 a gravesite was discovered dating from between 450 - 650 AD. Of the nearly 200 graves found one site was of particular interest. Buried deeper than the other graves was a preserved wooden chamber containing a gold helmet.von Stoessen. It has been suggested that this was the crown or helmet of the partial king of Stoessen.

This is the earliest known derivation of the Stößner name, although Volkmannsdorf and Schöndorf also had Stößners living in those locations as well. Hereditary surnames were first used in Germany in the twelfth century.

== Prominent Stößners ==
Nicol (1499- 1543?)
Landowner in Schöndorf bei Schleiz

Nicol, ev., (1577-1611)
Landowner in Schöndorf bei Schleiz

Hans Melchior
(1678-?) Dragoon in Poessneck. Participant in The Great Northern War?.

Hans (1652-1727)
Fiefdom holder in Volkmannsdorf, district of Schleiz, Thuringia.

Hans Georg (1673-1727)
Textile mill owner (Linen) Volkmannsdorf, district of Schleiz, Thuringia.

Hans Andreas (1711-1783)
Royal and Electoral Saxon Mayor and Judge of Volkmannsdorf, Germany.

The sovereign, King of Poland and at the same time Elector of Saxony, resided in Dresden. His territory was divided into districts. Volkmannsdorf belonged to county Neusatdt, district of Ziegenrück. The office was administered Arnshaugk (later Neustadt an der Orla) by the same official (Amtsschoesser). A village mayor (Schultheiss, Amtsschulze) had several duties: He was the village/county judge responsible for justice at a local level, for keeping order, for commercial affairs and was representative for absentee landlords.

Volkmannsdorf had various landlords. The knight's estate von Liebschuetz, Upper Court, with the Lords of Obernitz was one such landlord. They appointed Hans Andreas Stoessner to be judge in Volkmannsdorf. Nobility also had much power in their small fiefdoms which were, in some cases, looked upon as autonomous states. Some 300 existed across Germany. residing at the Family Estate in Bucha. During the 20th century the Estate was used as an Equestrian Center. Its architecture is typically German in style with several plastered and timbered structures.

Christoph (1785-1835?)
The King's Forester in Saxe-Hildburghausen.

Johann Gottlob I (1747-1813)
Judge in Bucha. residing at the family estate in Bucha. In the 20th century the estate was used as an equestrian center. Its architecture is typical German in style with several plastered and timbered structures.

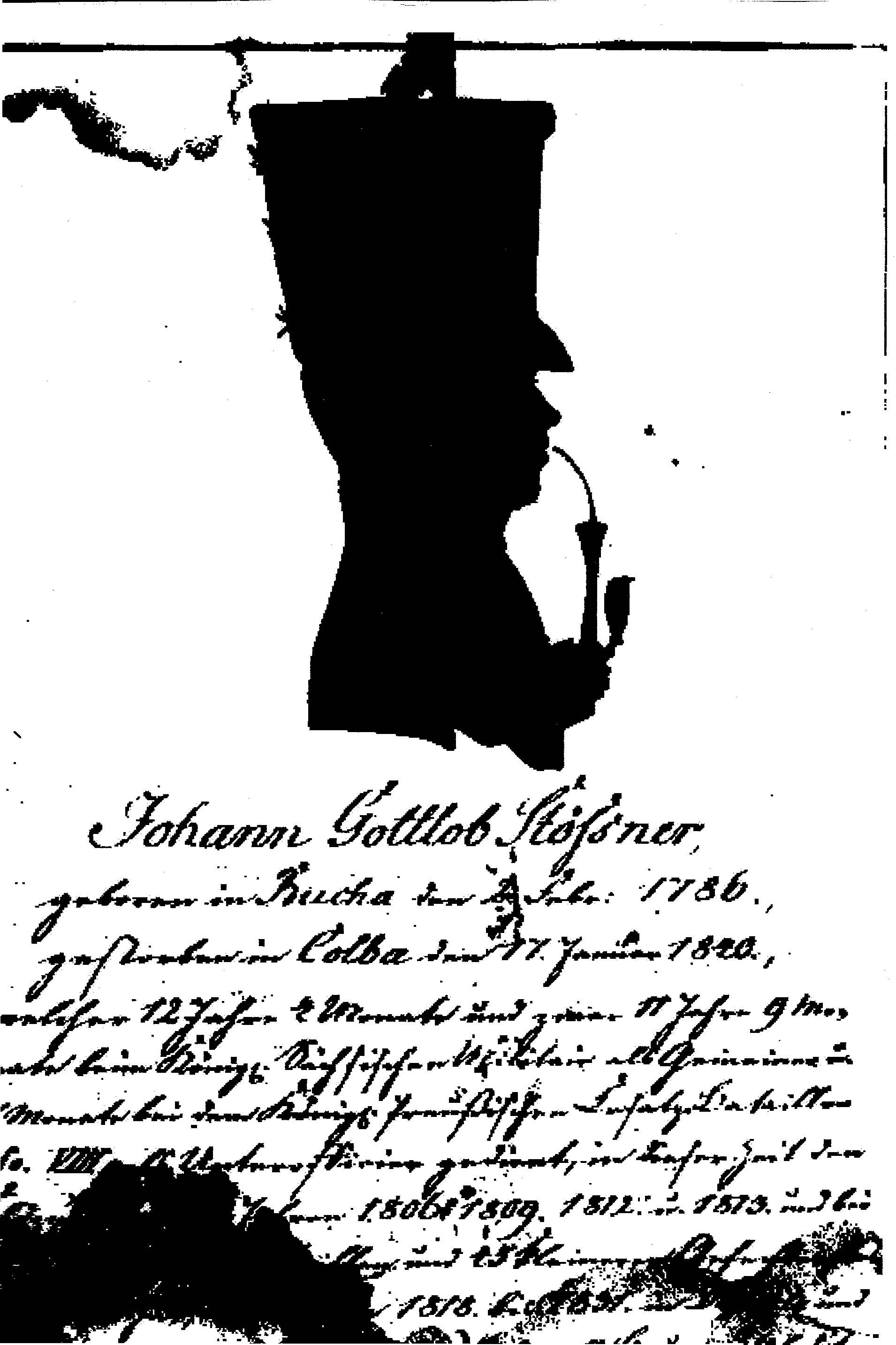

Johann Gottlob II (1787-1841)
Corporal under Napoleon Bonaparte in the Confederation of the Rhine from 1806–1813. He served twelve years and four months with the Royal Saxon Army and seven months with the Royal Prussian Replacement Battalion Nr.VIII as an NCO, during this time he was in the field 1806, 1809, 1812, 1813 and took part in thirteen major battles and 45 minor skirmishes. He lived in Dobritz from 1813-1831 and from this time until his death as the owner of an estate in Kolba (Saale-Orla-Kreis).
Johann Andreas (1763-1842)
Bucha. Owner of the Stoessner Estate. Johann Andres Stoessner also held a farmstead or "Hufe". The word Hufe is related to "Hof". A Hufe was formerly used to describe property. The size varying from village to village. Hufes were measured by Hectares which measured 2.5 acres (10,000 m^{2}). Parish books in Bucha list his death on 29 November 1842 at the age of 79.

Ernst Wilhelm (1808-1891)
Horse Trainer/Master in Saxe-Meiningen.

Eduard Heinrich (1841-1884)
Engineer in Saxe-Meiningen.

Auguste von Bamberg-Stoessner (1808-1881)
Wife of Ernst Wilhelm. Auguste was a descendant of the von Bamberg Family.

Wilhelm Theodor (1838-1885)
Engineer in Dresden

August (1839-1889)
Dresden. Officer, King's German Legion.

Dr. Med. Johann Christian (1784-1850?)
Obergoelitz. Medical Doctor, Pharmacist.

Dr. Phil. Eduard Heinrich Bernhard (1821-1892)
Director of School in Döbeln.

Carl Christoph (1846-1916?)
Director of the train system in Dresden. The year 1889 is the birthdate of Dresden's streetcar system. With approximately 6,000,000DM German marks Carl Christoph Stoessner created the first Strassenbahnlinien Committee and also became its first director. The streetcars were painted yellow to pay respect to the noble Thurn und Taxis family. To this day the trains are the same colors.

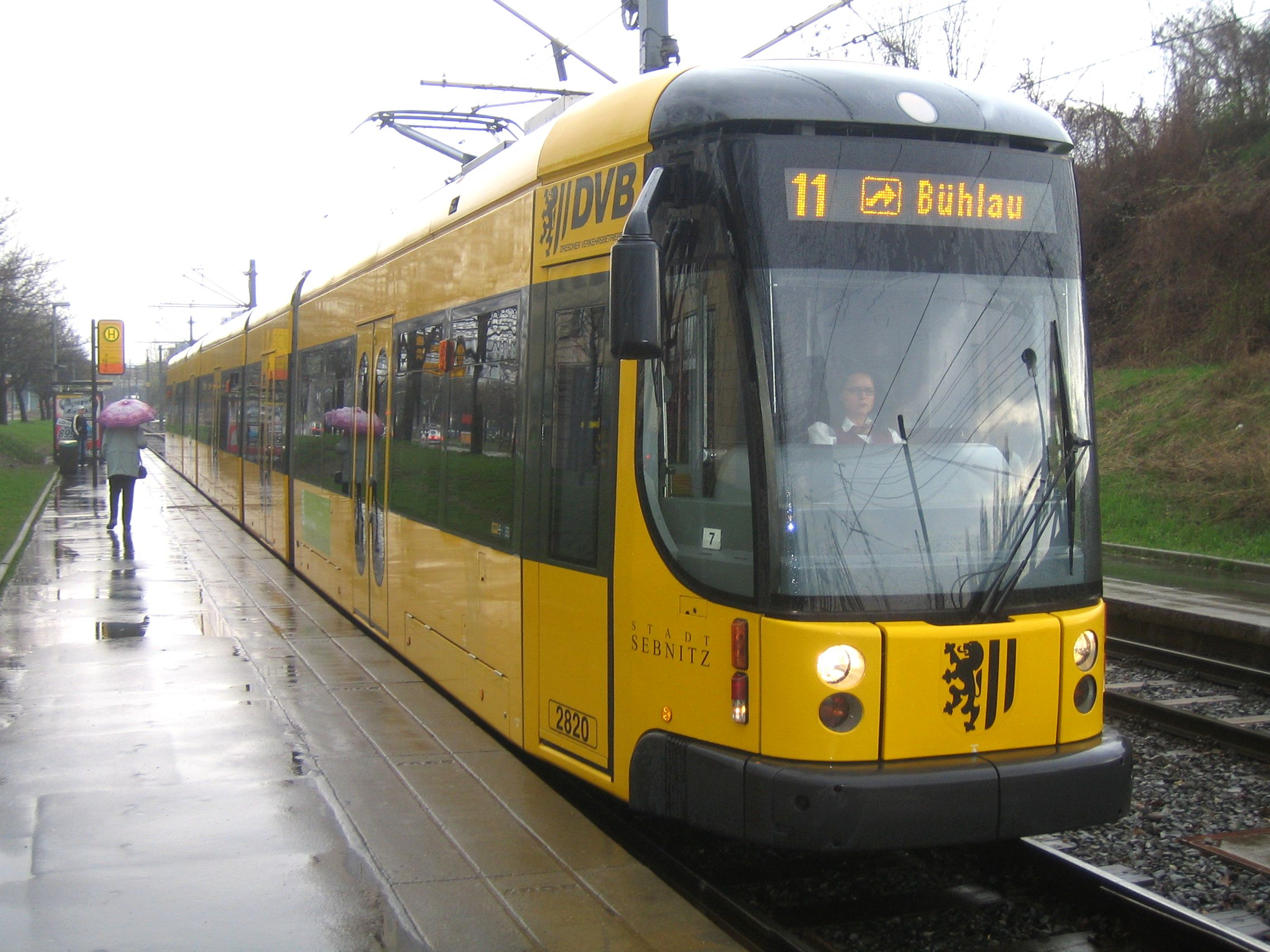
Dresden S-Bahn

Clara Marie Lomler zu Reudnitz-Stoessner
Wife of Carl Christoph. Married in 1877.

Dr. Eduard Ferdinand (1856-1909)
Helstedt. Medical Doctor. Published Author of [Elemente der Geographie in Karten und Text]1873 Eisenach

Dr. Med. Karl (1862-?)
Annaberg. Medical Doctor.

Volkmar Eugen Wilhelm (1870-1937)
Financial Advisor in Weimar.

Dr. Phil. Arthur Theodor (1873-1938)
Dresden. Director of Studies in Dresden. Published Author of [Lehrbuch der Padagogischen - Auf Grundlage der physiologisch-experimentellen Psychologie] 1911, 1920, 1921 Leipzig
Horst Oskar Wilhelm (1888-1972)
Dresden. Colonel in German Military.

Rudolph S. (1893-1918)
Banker in Saale, Second Lieutenant Feldflieger Pilot Officer World War I. † Shot down over Billy-Montigny, Lille, N. France

Johannes Paul Otto (1894-1915)
† NCO World War I Hooge, Belgium Sept. 25, 1915.

Erich Karl (1896-1918)
Lieutenant World War I. † at Chateau Lesdain, Battle of Cambrai (1918).

Gerhardt Willi Kurt (1898-1978)
Major in Selb.

== Coat of arms ==
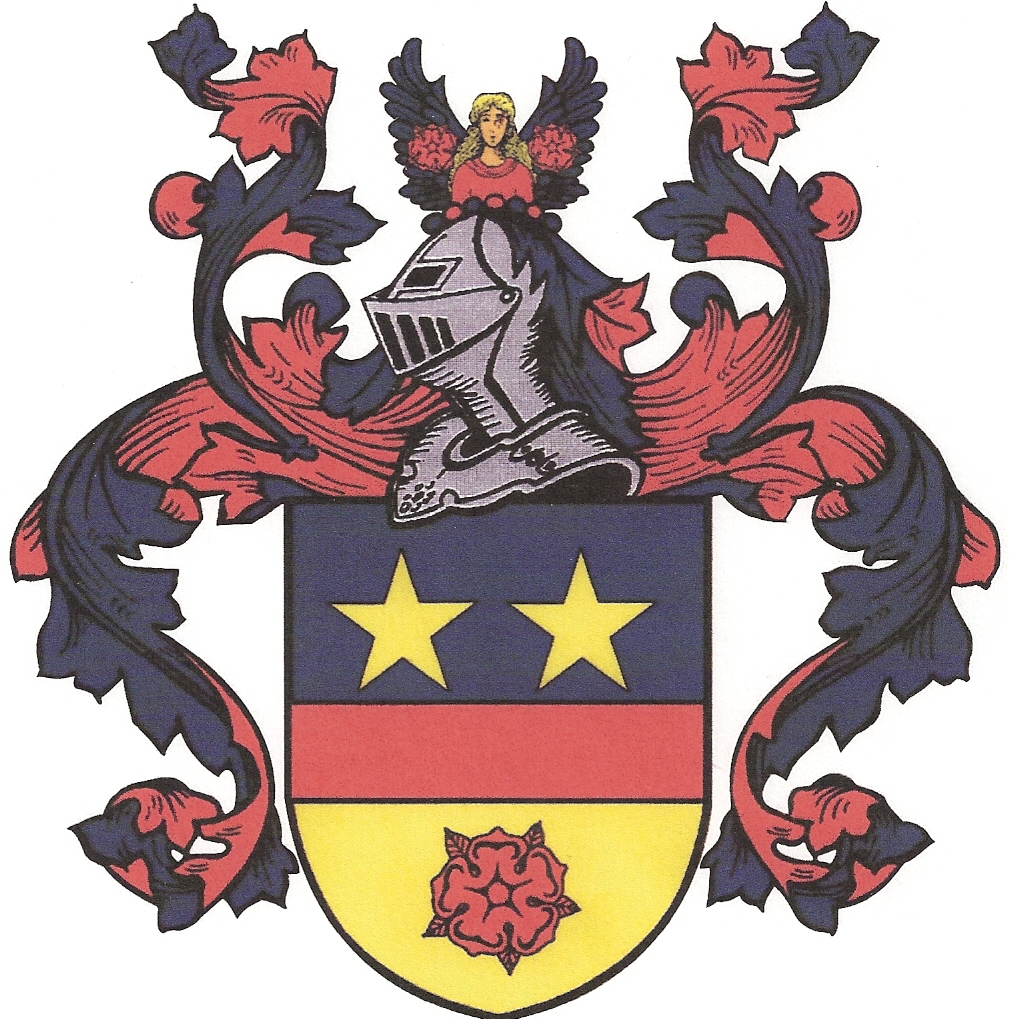
Stößner arms

Blazon of arms

Per fess, 1st azure, two mullets in fess or; 2nd or, a rose gules; overall a fess gules.

Crest

Between a vol azure, each wing charged with a rose gules, the bust of a woman with hair or and vested gules.
