= Battle of Schleiz =

1806 Battle during the War of the Fourth Coalition

- Part of the War of the Fourth Coalition
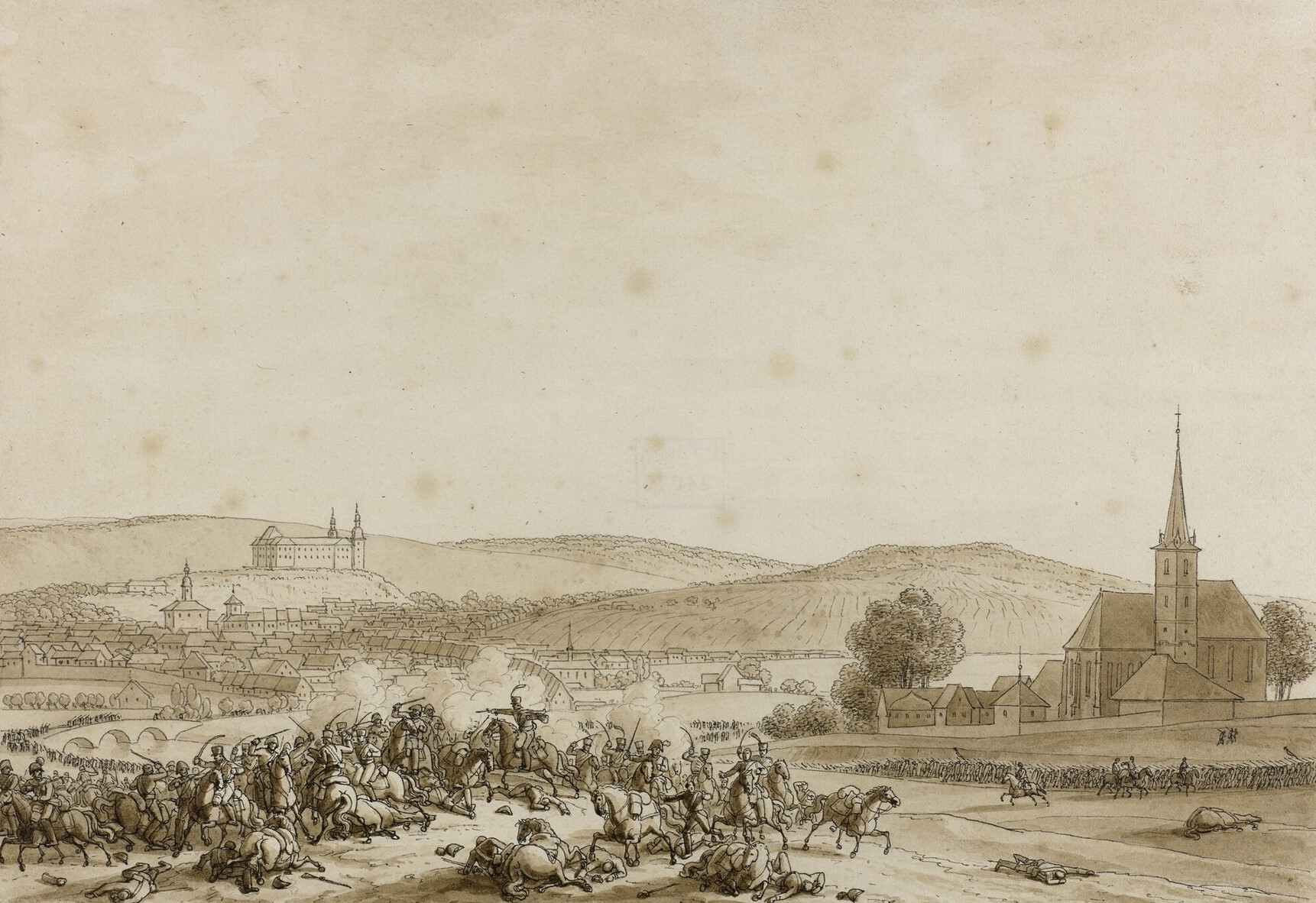
- Drawing by Benjamin Zix, 1806
Date	9 October 1806
Location	Schleiz, Thuringia, Germany 50.5833°N 11.8167°E
Result	French victory

Belligerents
(France) French Empire	(Kingdom of Prussia) Prussia (Electorate of Saxony) Saxony

Commanders and leaders
(France) Joachim Murat (France) Jean Bernadotte (France) Jean-Baptiste Drouet	(Kingdom of Prussia) Bogislav von Tauentzien

Strength
20,594; 34 guns Engaged: 4,000; 12 guns	9,000; Engaged: 2,600; 8 guns

Casualties and losses
light	566; 1 gun lost

War of the Fourth Coalition
⬤ current battle
⬤ Napoleon not in command
⬤ Napoleon in command

The Battle of Schleiz took place on 9 October 1806 in Schleiz, Germany between a Prussian-Saxon division under Bogislav Friedrich Emanuel von Tauentzien and a part of Jean-Baptiste Bernadotte's I Corps under the command of Jean-Baptiste Drouet, Comte d'Erlon. It was the first clash of the War of the Fourth Coalition, part of the Napoleonic Wars. As Emperor Napoleon I of France's Grande Armée advanced north through the Franconian Forest it struck the left wing of the armies belonging to the Kingdom of Prussia and the Electorate of Saxony, which were deployed on a long front. Schleiz is located 30 kilometers north of Hof and 145 kilometers southwest of Dresden at the intersection of Routes 2 and 94.

At the beginning of the battle, elements of Drouet's division clashed with Tauentzien's outposts. When Tauentzien became aware of the strength of the advancing French forces, he began a tactical withdrawal of his division. Joachim Murat assumed command of the troops and began an aggressive pursuit. A battalion-sized Prussian force to the west was cut off and suffered heavy losses. The Prussians and Saxons retreated north, reaching Auma that evening.

== Background ==
=== Political ===
During the War of the Third Coalition, King Frederick William III of Prussia signed the Potsdam Accord with Tsar Alexander I of Russia, an active belligerent, on 3 November 1805. Frederick William promised to send an ambassador to Napoleon with an offer of armed mediation. Unless the French emperor agreed to disgorge the Kingdom of Holland and Switzerland, and renounce the crown of the Kingdom of Italy, the Prussians would join the Austrian Empire and the Russian Empire against Napoleon.

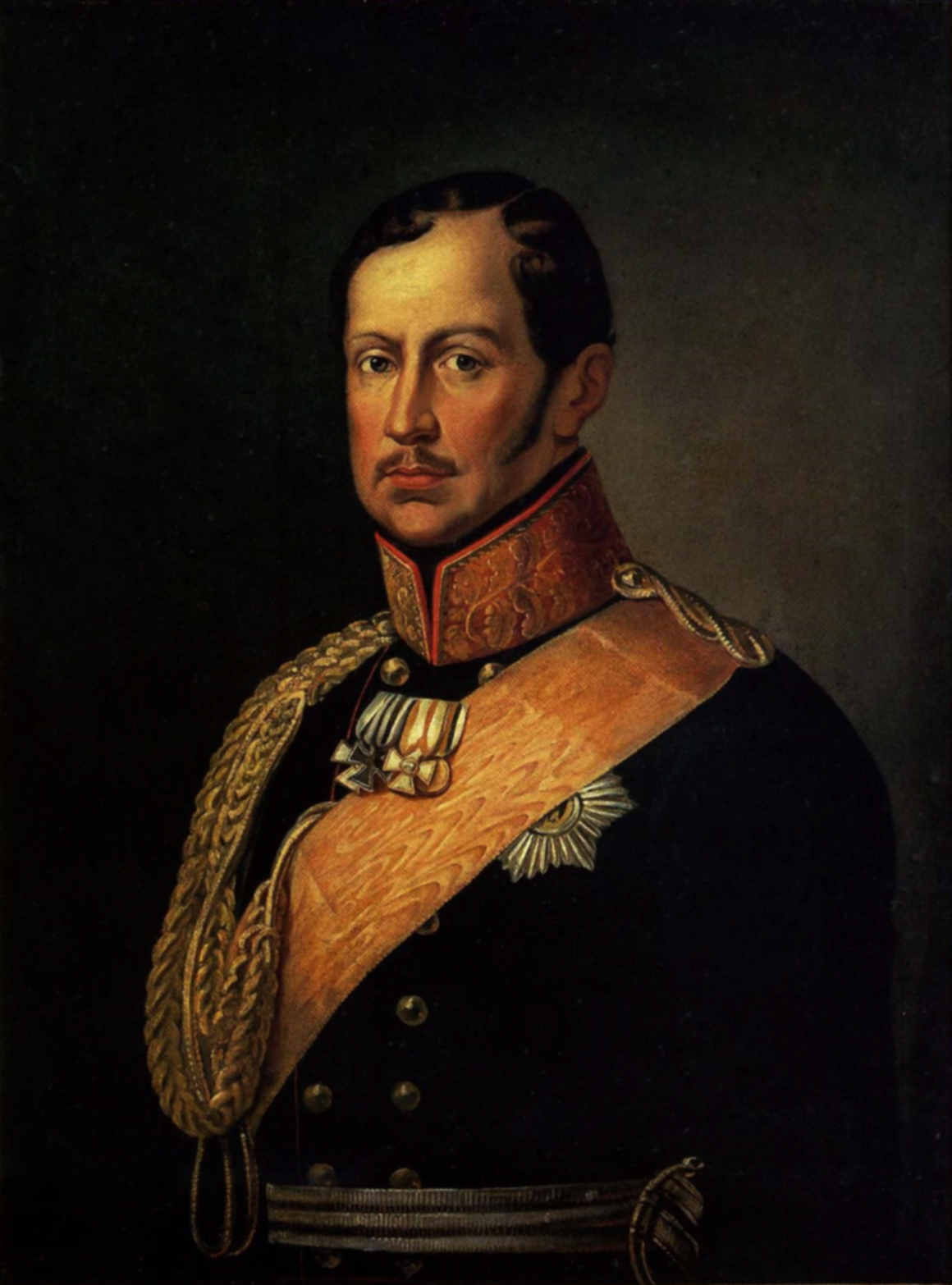
King Frederick William III

Curiously, the Prussian army had already been mobilized against Russia in September when the tsar demanded that Prussia join the Third Coalition. Irritated by Napoleon's violation of its territory of Ansbach in September 1805, Prussia subsequently moved toward an understanding with Russia. Napoleon managed to stall the Prussian ambassador Christian Graf von Haugwitz until after his great victory at the Battle of Austerlitz on 2 December 1805. Soon afterward, Austria sued for peace and Russia withdrew its troops, effectively dissolving the Third Coalition.

On 15 February, Napoleon maneuvered Prussia into agreeing to transfer several of her territories to France and France's allies in return for Hanover, which France had previously occupied. France invaded the Kingdom of Naples on 8 February 1806 and the last foothold on the Italian peninsula fell to the conquerors on 23 July. On 25 July, Napoleon created the Confederation of the Rhine, a French satellite in Germany. In the face of these French aggressions, the pro-war faction at the Prussian court, centered around Queen Louise, soon gained the upper hand. The pacific Haugwitz was dismissed as chief minister and on 7 August 1806 King Frederick William determined to go to war against Napoleon.

=== Military ===
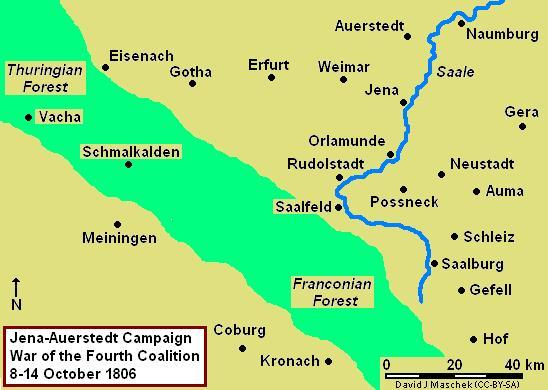
Jena-Auerstedt Campaign Map, 8–14 October 1806

Prussia mobilized 171,000 soldiers, including 35,000 cavalry, 15,000 gunners, and 20,000 Saxon allies. The troops were grouped in three armies. Feldmarschall Charles William Ferdinand, Duke of Brunswick concentrated his soldiers around Leipzig and Naumburg in the center. The left wing, led by General of the Infantry Frederick Louis, Prince of Hohenlohe-Ingelfingen assembled near Dresden and included the Saxon contingent. Generals Ernst von Rüchel and Gebhard Leberecht von Blücher gathered the right wing at Göttingen and Mühlhausen.

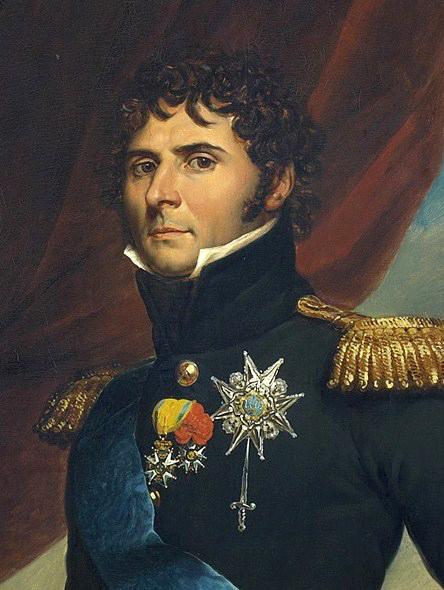
Marshal Jean Bernadotte led the center column.

Presently, Napoleon became aware of the Prussian preparations for war. He called up 50,000 conscripts of the class of 1806 on 5 September and put the French forces in Germany on alert. When he received intelligence that the Prussians absorbed the Saxon army into their forces, he rapidly massed his Grande Armée with the goal of destroying the Prussian army. On 5 October, Napoleon issued an order describing the order of march for the Grande Armée's invasion of the Electorate of Saxony. Marshal Bernadotte's I Corps led the center column, followed by Marshal Louis Davout's III Corps, most of Marshal Murat's Cavalry Reserve, and Marshal François Joseph Lefebvre's Imperial Guard. The right column was formed by Marshal Nicolas Soult's IV Corps in the lead, Marshal Michel Ney's VI Corps, and the Bavarians in the rear. The left column contained Marshal Jean Lannes' V Corps, followed by Marshal Pierre Augereau's VII Corps. Napoleon directed the right column toward Hof, the center column from Kronach to Schleiz, and the left column from Coburg to Saalfeld.

The 59,131-strong right column's IV Corps numbered 30,956 infantry, 1,567 cavalry, and 48 guns, its VI Corps had 18,414 infantry, 1,094 cavalry, and 24 guns, and Lieutenant General Karl Philipp von Wrede's Bavarian division had 6,000 infantry, 1,100 cavalry, and 18 guns. The 38,055-man left column's V Corps counted 19,389 infantry, 1,560 cavalry, and 28 guns and its VII Corps had 15,931 infantry, 1,175 cavalry, and 36 guns. The 75,637-man center column's I Corps numbered 19,014 infantry, 1,580 cavalry, and 34 guns, its III Corps had 28,655 infantry, 1,538 cavalry, and 44 guns, its Imperial Guard had 4,900 infantry, 2,400 cavalry, and 36 guns, its Cavalry Reserve had 17,550 troopers and 30 guns. Not counted in the previous totals were 9,000 gunners, sappers, and others.

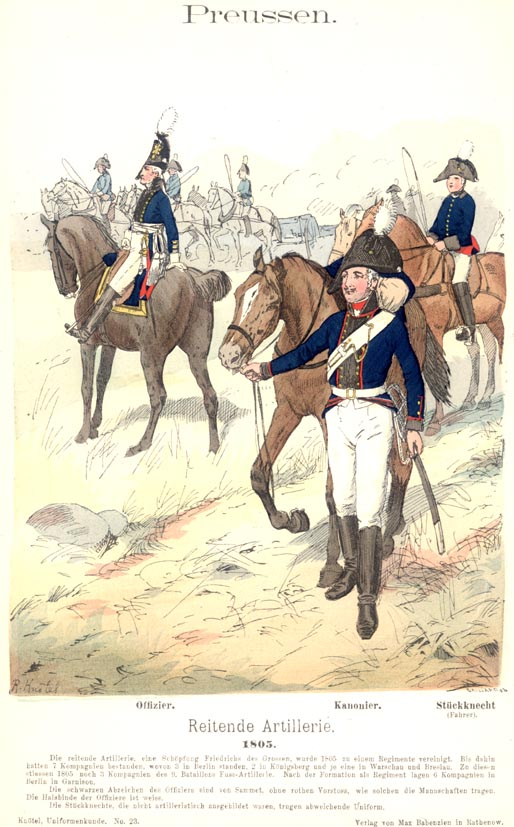
Prussian horse artillery, 1805

The Prussian high command held several councils of war but no strategy could be agreed upon until a 5 October reconnaissance revealed Napoleon's forces were already moving north from Bayreuth toward Saxony. Then it was decided that Hohenlohe would move to Rudolstadt, Brunswick to Erfurt, and Rüchel to Gotha. The right wing would send forces to menace the French communications at Fulda. The Reserve under General Eugene Frederick Henry, Duke of Württemberg was ordered to move from Magdeburg to Halle.

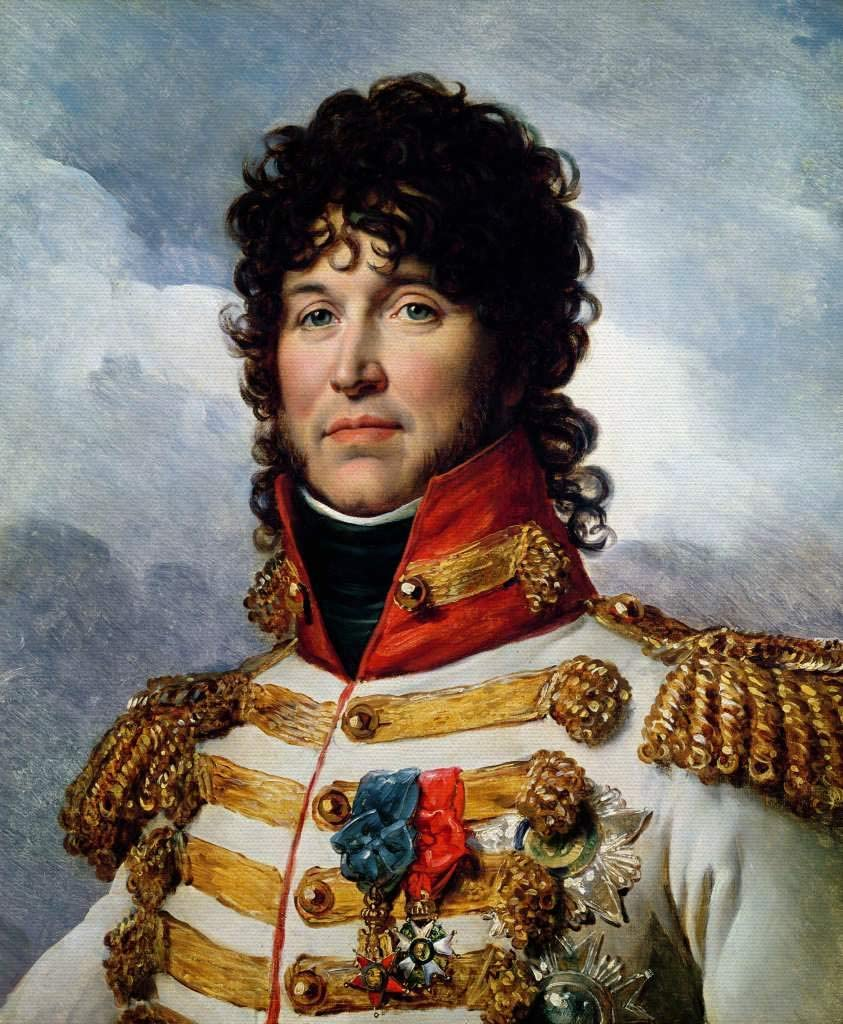
Marshal Joachim Murat led the cavalry screen.

The Thuringian and Franconian forests stretch northwestward from Bohemia. This area is composed of wooded mountains of about 750 meters altitude. In 1806, there were only a few poor roads through the tract. Napoleon selected his invasion route in the zone where the belt of rough terrain was narrowest, the Franconian Forest to the east. The French army crossed the Saxon border on 8 October, screened in front by light cavalry. Napoleon was not certain where the opposing Prussian-Saxon army was located, so his army was arranged in a battalion carré (battalion square), capable of concentrating against threats coming from any direction.

Murat personally led the light cavalry screen in front of Napoleon's battalion carré. In the east General of Brigade Antoine Lasalle scouted toward Hof, while General of Brigade Édouard Jean Baptiste Milhaud probed toward Saalfeld to the west. Napoleon directed General of Brigade Pierre Watier to take one regiment from his brigade and push as far forward as possible in front of the I Corps. The objects of the light cavalry's attentions were the location of Prussian and Saxon units and details of the road net. On the 8th, Murat's horsemen seized the bridge at Saalburg-Ebersdorf. A small defending force fell back east to Gefell where it rendezvoused with General-Major Tauentzien as his division retreated north from Hof. That evening, Tauentzien assembled his troops at Schleiz.

About 9,000 Saxons lay at Auma 15 kilometers north-northeast of Schleiz and Oberst Carl Andreas von Boguslawski's Prussian detachment was 18 kilometers north-northwest at Neustadt an der Orla. General-Major Christian Ludwig Schimmelpfennig's detachment of 600 cavalry was 20 kilometers to the northwest at Pößneck. Tauentzien's division counted 6,000 Prussians and 3,000 Saxons. Bernadotte's three infantry divisions were led by Generals of Division Drouet, Pierre Dupont de l'Etang, and Olivier Macoux Rivaud de la Raffinière, and his corps cavalry brigade by General of Brigade Jacques Louis François Delaistre de Tilly. General of Division Jean Baptiste Eblé commanded the corps artillery reserve.

== Battle ==
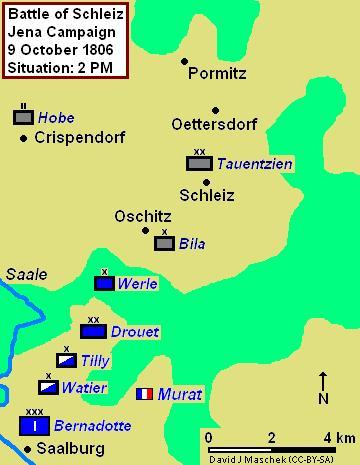
Battle of Schleiz, 9 October 1806 at 2 pm

See the Jena-Auerstedt Campaign Order of Battle for the composition and organization of the French, Prussian, and Saxon armies.

On 9 October, the first clash occurred between the troops of Bernadotte and Tauentzien near the Oschitz Wood, a belt of timber which lies south of Schleiz. Bernadotte ordered General of Brigade François Werlé to clear the forest to the right as Drouet's division advanced on Schleiz. In the thick woods, the infantry moved ahead while Watier's regiment followed behind. Werlé's advance guard took possession of the woods but was prevented from continuing on by a Prussian force under General-Major Rudolf Ernst Christoph von Bila. Petre calls this general Bila II and his older brother Bila I. This gives the names and dates of the two Bila brothers.

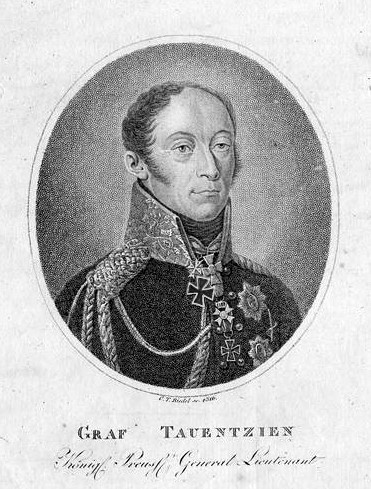
Bogislav Tauentzien

By 2:00 pm, the French were in strength and Tauenzien decided to abandon Schleiz. The Prussian division fell back to the north covered by Bila's rear guard of one infantry battalion and one and a half cavalry regiments. Drouet attacked Schleiz at 4:00 pm and drove out the last of the Prussians. North of the town, Murat charged the rear guard with the 4th Hussar Regiment, but this attack was repulsed by the Prussian horsemen. Reinforced by the 5th Chasseurs à Cheval Regiment and with infantry support, Murat pressed back Bila's troops to the wood north of Oettersdorf. (Note: Google Earth was used throughout the article to determine directions and straight-line distances between Petre's locations.)

Earlier, Tauentzien sent an officer named Hobe with one battalion, one squadron, and two guns to Crispendorf about six kilometers west of Schleiz. Hobe's assignment was to guard the right flank and maintain communications with Schimmelpfennig's cavalry in Pößneck. When Tauenzien began to fall back, Hobe's detachment retreated to the northeast to rejoin his division. At the wood near Pörmitz, a village four kilometers north of Schleiz, the detachment found itself caught between Murat's cavalry and one of Drouet's battalions. Attacked in a marshy forest, Hobe's force was badly mauled and lost one of its cannons. Most of the losses in the battle were from Hobe's luckless detachment. The Prussians and Saxons lost 12 officers and 554 rank and file killed, wounded, captured, and missing, as well as one artillery piece captured. French losses are unknown but probably light.

== Result ==
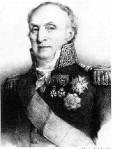
Jean Drouet

Tauentzien retreated to Auma where his tired and hungry troops camped at 7:00 pm. Joined to the Saxon troops under General der Kavallerie Hans Gottlob von Zeschwitz, the total number of troops at Auma was 16,400 strong. That evening, Boguslawski's 3,000 men were still at Neustadt and Schimmelpfennig's 600 cavalry remained at Pößneck. Prince Louis Ferdinand of Prussia's 8,000-man division held Saalfeld to the west. Hohenlohe had 8,000 troops at Orlamünde south of Jena.

The rest of the Prussian army was strung out to the west. Brunswick with the main body lay at Erfurt. Rüchel was positioned farther west near Gotha, while Blücher held Eisenach. General Karl August, Grand Duke of Saxe-Weimar-Eisenach led an 11,000-man corps with an advance guard at Schmalkalden and a detachment under General Christian Ludwig von Winning at Vacha. Duke Eugene of Württemberg's Reserve lay far to the north between Magdeburg and Halle.

When Hohenlohe heard about the encounter at Schleiz, he ordered the troops of his left wing to mass between Rudolstadt and Jena before moving east to the support of Tauentzien and the Saxons. However, Brunswick refused to allow the maneuver so Hohenlohe suspended it. In the meantime, Hohenlohe sent a vaguely worded order to Louis Ferdinand, which the prince misinterpreted as an order to defend Saalfeld. The Battle of Saalfeld occurred the next day in front of Lannes' left flank corps.

== Commentary ==
Historian Francis Loraine Petre notes that Napoleon's Grande Armée had a superior organization, employed better tactics, had more youthful and energetic subordinates, and enjoyed a 20% to 25% numerical superiority over their enemies. The French corps were commanded by marshals capable of managing the details of their organizations. Lacking the corps system, the Prussian commanders were often forced to issue orders that went into great detail. The French army was led by a single commander who alone made the decisions. Against Napoleon, the leaders of the Prussian army, who were mostly older, frequently held councils of war which "never decided anything definite". Though Brunswick was nominally the Prussian commander in chief, his orders had to be confirmed by King Frederick William, while Hohenlohe and Rüchel were almost independent of him. Napoleon's strategy was simple, but the Prussian generals felt compelled to plan for every eventuality, resulting in a much wider deployment of their forces. On the evening of 9 October, between Winning's detachment in the west and Zeschwitz's Saxons in the east, the Prussian-Saxon army covered a 145 kilometer front. Furthermore, the Reserve was hopelessly out of touch at Magdeburg. Meanwhile, Napoleon's powerful bataillon carré advanced on a front of only 60 kilometers. In this paragraph, the distances are Petre's.

== Notes ==
Preceded by Battle of Maida	Napoleonic Wars; Battle of Schleiz	Succeeded by Battle of Saalfeld
