= Saale-Orla-Kreis II =

Electoral constituency in Thuringia, Germany

Saale-Orla-Kreis II is an electoral constituency (German: Wahlkreis) represented in the Landtag of Thuringia. It elects one member via first-past-the-post voting. Under the current constituency numbering system, it is designated as constituency 34. It covers the northern part of Saale-Orla-Kreis.

Saale-Orla-Kreis II was created for the 1994 state election. Since 2414, it has been represented by Ringo Mühlmann of Alternative for Germany (AfD).

== Geography ==
As of the 2019 state election, Saale-Orla-Kreis II covers the northern part of Saale-Orla-Kreis, specifically the municipalities of Bodelwitz, Döbritz, Dreitzsch, Eßbach, Geroda, Gertewitz, Gössitz, Grobengereuth, Keila, Kospoda, Krölpa, Langenorla, Lausnitz b. Neustadt an der Orla, Lemnitz, Linda b. Neustadt an der Orla, Miesitz, Mittelpöllnitz, Moxa, Neustadt an der Orla, Nimritz, Oberoppurg, Oppurg, Paska, Peuschen, Pößneck, Quaschwitz, Ranis, Rosendorf, Schleiz (only Crispendorf), Schmieritz, Schmorda, Schöndorf, Seisla, Solkwitz, Tömmelsdorf, Triptis, Weira, Wernburg, Wilhelmsdorf, and Ziegenrück.

== Members ==
The constituency was held by the Christian Democratic Union from its creation in 1994 until 2009, during which time it was represented by Gottfried Schugens. It was won by The Left in 2009, and was represented by Heidrun Sedlacik. The CDU's candidate Christian Herrgott regained the constituency in 2014, and was re-elected in 2019. In 2024, Ringo Mühlmann of Alternative for Germany won the seat.

Election	Member	Party	%
1994	Gottfried Schugens	CDU	42.7
1999	Gottfried Schugens	CDU	46.9
2004	Gottfried Schugens	CDU	41.5
2009	Heidrun Sedlacik	LINKE	30.1
2014	Christian Herrgott	CDU	39.8
2019	Christian Herrgott	CDU	32.5
2024	Ringo Mühlmann	AfD	44.6

== Election results ==
=== 2024 election ===
State election (2024): Saale-Orla-Kreis II
Notes:	Blue background denotes the winner of the electorate vote. Pink background denotes a candidate elected from their party list. Yellow background denotes an electorate win by a list member, or other incumbent. A ✓ or ✗ denotes status of any incumbent, win or lose respectively.						
Party	Candidate	Votes	%	±%	Party votes	%	±%
AfD	Ringo Mühlmann	10,402	44.6	▲15.6	9,456	40.2	▲11.8
CDU	Fred Nimczick	7,752	33.2	▼0.3	5,542	23.6	▲2.5
BSW					3,570	15.2	
Left	Anastasia-Geuneviéve Rahaus	2,522	10.8	▼13.0	2,487	10.6	▼20.7
SPD	Anja Grossmann	1,207	5.2	▼0.8	895	3.8	▼2.2
FDP	Martin Mehlhos	597	2.6	▼1.9	268	1.1	▼3.8
UBV	Dennis Kämmerle	532	2.3				
Greens	Caroline Jobst	391	1.4	▼2.8	353	1.5	▼1.4
APT					223	0.9	▼0.3
Values					212	0.9	
FW					187	0.8	
Familie					110	0.5	
BD					93	0.4	
Pirates					49	0.2	▼0.1
MLPD					31	0.1	▼0.2
ÖDP					31	0.1	▼0.3
Informal votes		338			162		
Total valid votes		23,331			23,507		
Turnout		23,669	74.8	▲8.1			
AfD gain from CDU	Majority	2,650	11.4				

=== 2019 election ===
State election (2019): Saale-Orla-Kreis II
Notes:	Blue background denotes the winner of the electorate vote. Pink background denotes a candidate elected from their party list. Yellow background denotes an electorate win by a list member, or other incumbent. A ✓ or ✗ denotes status of any incumbent, win or lose respectively.						
Party	Candidate	Votes	%	±%	Party votes	%	±%
CDU	✓ Christian Herrgott	6,945	32.5	▼7.3	4,539	21.1	▼13.6
AfD	Heiko Bergner	6,207	29.0		6,092	28.4	▲16.2
Left	Philipp Gliesing	5,084	23.8	▼8.1	6,730	31.3	▲1.9
SPD	Oskar Helmerich	1,278	6.0	▼10.7	1,291	6.0	▼5.0
FDP	Petra Philipp-Dietrich	964	4.5		1,062	4.9	▲2.9
Greens	Anne Rech	901	4.2	▼1.3	633	2.9	▼1.2
List-only parties					1,135	5.3	
Informal votes		363			260		
Total valid votes		21,379			21,482		
Turnout		21,742	66.7	▲13.4			
CDU hold	Majority	738	3.5	▼4.4			

=== 2014 election ===
State election (2014): Saale-Orla-Kreis II
Notes:	Blue background denotes the winner of the electorate vote. Pink background denotes a candidate elected from their party list. Yellow background denotes an electorate win by a list member, or other incumbent. A ✓ or ✗ denotes status of any incumbent, win or lose respectively.						
Party	Candidate	Votes	%	±%	Party votes	%	±%
CDU	Christian Herrgott	7,144	39.8	▲11.4	6,323	34.7	▲4.2
Left	Philipp Gliesing	5,740	31.9	▲1.8	5,356	29.4	▼0.2
AfD					2,219	12.2	
SPD	Frank Roßner	3,007	16.7	▼5.6	1,998	11.0	▼7.1
NPD	Kay Haller	1,079	6.0	▲0.7	691	3.8	▼1.0
Greens	Johannes Brink	996	5.5		746	4.1	▼0.1
List-only parties					890	4.9	
Informal votes		517			260		
Total valid votes		17,966			18,223		
Turnout		18,483	53.3	▼3.3			
CDU gain from Left	Majority	1,404	7.9				

=== 2009 election ===
State election (2009): Saale-Orla-Kreis II
Notes:	Blue background denotes the winner of the electorate vote. Pink background denotes a candidate elected from their party list. Yellow background denotes an electorate win by a list member, or other incumbent. A ✓ or ✗ denotes status of any incumbent, win or lose respectively.						
Party	Candidate	Votes	%	±%	Party votes	%	±%
Left	Heidrun Sedlacik	6,123	30.1	▲0.7	6,087	29.6	▲1.5
CDU	✗ Gottfried Schugens	5,785	28.4	▼13.1	6,269	30.5	▼12.2
SPD	Dagmar Künast	4,529	22.3	▼0.2	3,734	18.1	▲3.0
FDP	Alf-Heinz Borchardt	2,841	14.0	▲9.7	1,788	8.7	▲5.5
NPD	Peter Nürnberger	1,077	5.3		984	4.8	▲2.7
Greens					861	4.2	▲1.2
List-only parties					853	4.1	
Informal votes		644			423		
Total valid votes		20,355			20,576		
Turnout		20,999	56.6	▲2.5			
Left gain from CDU	Majority	338	1.7				

=== 2004 election ===
State election (2004): Saale-Orla-Kreis II
Notes:	Blue background denotes the winner of the electorate vote. Pink background denotes a candidate elected from their party list. Yellow background denotes an electorate win by a list member, or other incumbent. A ✓ or ✗ denotes status of any incumbent, win or lose respectively.						
Party	Candidate	Votes	%	±%	Party votes	%	±%
CDU	✓ Gottfried Schugens	8,168	41.5	▼5.4	8,530	42.7	▼7.8
PDS	Thomas Hofmann	5,783	29.4	▲10.7	5,603	28.1	▲9.2
SPD	Dagmar Künast	4,418	22.5	▼3.8	3,005	15.1	▼4.7
FDP	Monika Haseküster	842	4.3		634	3.2	▲2.2
Independent	Constanze Truschzinski	467	2.4				
List-only parties					2,187	11.0	
Informal votes		1,229			948		
Total valid votes		19,678			19,959		
Turnout		20,907	54.1	▼5.4			
CDU hold	Majority	2,385	12.1	▼8.5			

=== 1999 election ===
State election (1999): Saale-Orla-Kreis II
Notes:	Blue background denotes the winner of the electorate vote. Pink background denotes a candidate elected from their party list. Yellow background denotes an electorate win by a list member, or other incumbent. A ✓ or ✗ denotes status of any incumbent, win or lose respectively.						
Party	Candidate	Votes	%	±%	Party votes	%	±%
CDU	✓ Gottfried Schugens	10,759	46.9	▲4.3	11,647	50.5	▲5.9
SPD	Dagmar Künast	6,025	26.3	▼2.6	4,562	19.8	▼8.7
PDS	Thomas Hofmann	4,279	18.7	▲5.9	4,354	18.9	▲4.8
VIBT	Wolfgang Kleindienst	1,317	5.7		746	3.2	
REP	Bernd Pomper	559	2.4	▼0.5	269	1.2	▼1.5
List-only parties					1,470	6.4	
Informal votes		372			263		
Total valid votes		22,939			23,048		
Turnout		23,311	59.5	▼13.9			
CDU hold	Majority	4,734	20.6	▲6.9			

=== 1994 election ===
State election (1994): Saale-Orla-Kreis II
Notes:	Blue background denotes the winner of the electorate vote. Pink background denotes a candidate elected from their party list. Yellow background denotes an electorate win by a list member, or other incumbent. A ✓ or ✗ denotes status of any incumbent, win or lose respectively.						
Party	Candidate	Votes	%	±%	Party votes	%	±%
CDU	Gottfried Schugens	11,664	42.7		12,363	44.8	
SPD		7,929	29.0		7,862	28.5	
PDS		3,487	12.8		3,877	14.1	
FDP		2,131	7.8		1,115	4.0	
Greens		1,347	4.9		1,051	3.8	
REP		781	2.9		740	2.7	
List-only parties					572	2.1	
Informal votes		833			592		
Total valid votes		27,339			27,580		
Turnout		28,172	73.3				
CDU win new seat	Majority	3,735	13.7				
