= Albert Abicht =

German politician

Albert Abicht (9 December 1893 in Lemnitz, Saxe-Weimar-Eisenach – 5 January 1973, in Nuremberg) was a German farmer and politician (ThLB/DNVP, NSDAP).

== Agriculture ==
After elementary school, Abicht attended the agricultural school in Triptis from 1908 to 1910 and then went into agriculture. He served military service during World War. From 1917, he worked as a cashier in town Leubsdorf. Later he returned to his original profession, and in 1928 rented an estate in Oberpöllnitz. From 1927, he was chairman of the Agriculture department in Gera district, Thuringia and a member of the Main Chamber of Agriculture in Weimar. In addition, he held various positions in the agricultural community.

== Politics ==
Abicht joined the Thuringian Agricultural League in the 1920s and briefly joined the German National People's Party from 1931 to 1932. In 1933 he joined the Nazi Party. From 1924, he was a member of the district council of Gera district, and in the general election of July 1932 he was elected to the DNVP in the German Reichstag, which he served in until November 1933. In Parliament he represented the constituency of Thuringia.

From 1922 to 1928, Abicht served as mayor of the municipality of Leubsdorf. At the same time he was chairman of the rural community association for Gera and board member of the rural community day in Weimar, Thuringia.
