= Karl Heinrich Frotscher =

German classical philologist

- Born: May 6, 1796; Weira, Saale-Orla-Kreis, Thuringia, Germany
- Died: Freiberg, Saxony, Germany
- Known for: Scholarly editions of Xenophon, Cicero, Quintilian, and Velleius

Academic background
- Education: University of Leipzig

Academic work
- Discipline: Classical philology

Karl Heinrich Frotscher (6 May 1796, in Weira – 9 April 1876, in Freiberg) was a German classical philologist, known for his scholarly editions of Xenophon, Cicero, Quintilian and Velleius.

From 1815 he studied philology at the University of Leipzig, where his teachers included Christian Daniel Beck, Gottfried Hermann and Ernst Platner. He served as an auxiliary teacher at the Thomasschule zu Leipzig, and in 1820 became an instructor at the Nikolaischule. From 1822 he worked as a librarian at the Ratsbibliothek (council library), and in 1826 obtained his habilitation at the university.

In 1828 he was named an associate professor at the university and promoted to conrector at the Nikolaischule. In 1835 he was appointed rector at the gymnasium in Annaberg-Buchholz, and from 1843 worked in a similar capacity at the gymnasium in Freiberg, a position he maintained up until his retirement in 1865.

== Selected works ==
- Xenophontis Hiero : recensuit et interpretatus est (edition of Xenophon's Hiero, 1822). digitized
- Quae exstant. Ex recensione et cum adnotationibus Theophili Cortii (edition of Sallust, 1825).
- Institutionum oratoriarum liber decimus (edition of Dionysius of Halicarnassus, 1826).
- Marci Fabi Quinctiliani Institutionum oratoriarum liber decimus (edition of Quintilian, 1826).
- Eloquentium virorum narrationes de vitis hominum doctrina et virtute excellentium (1826).
- M. Tullii Ciceronis Ad Marcus Brutum Orator (with Heinrich Meyer / edition of Cicero, 1827).
- C. Velleii Paterculi quae supersunt ex Historiae romanae voluminibus duobus (with others / edition of Velleius, 1830).
- P. Rutilii Lupi De figuris sententiarum et elocutionis libri duo item Aquilae romani et Iulii Rufiniani de eodem argumento libri (with David Ruhnken / edition of Publius Rutilius Lupus, 1831).
- M. Tullii Ciceronis Oratio pro P. Sulla (edition of Cicero, 1831).
- Q. Asconius Pedianus in M. Tullii Ciceronis Orationem (edition of Asconius Pedianus, 1845).
