= Tegau =

- Municipality
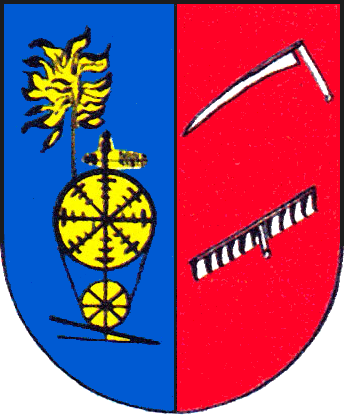
- Coat of arms

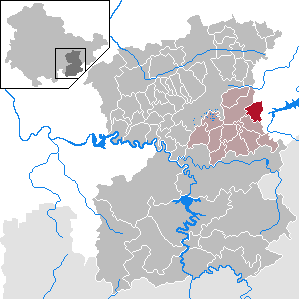
- Location of Tegau within Saale-Orla-Kreis district
- Interactive map of Tegau
- Location within Germany Location within Thuringia
- Coordinates: 50°39′N 11°52′E
- Country: Germany
- State: Thuringia
- District: Saale-Orla-Kreis
- Municipal assoc.: Seenplatte

Government
  - Mayor (2022–28): Gottfried Löffler

Area
  - Total: 7.16 km^{2} (2.76 sq mi)
- Elevation: 450 m (1,480 ft)

Population (2025-12-31)
  - Total: 387
  - Density: 54.1/km^{2} (140/sq mi)
- Time zone: UTC+01:00 (CET)
  - Summer (DST): UTC+02:00 (CEST)
- Postal codes: 07907
- Dialling codes: 036648
- Vehicle registration: SOK

Tegau (German pronunciation: [ˈteːɡaʊ]) is a municipality in the district Saale-Orla-Kreis, in Thuringia, Germany and has a last reported population of 382 people.
