= Langenorla =

- Municipality
- Coat of arms

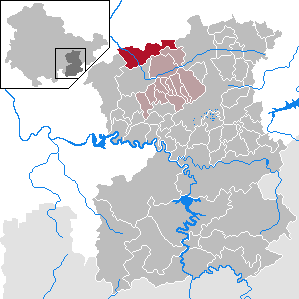
- Location of Langenorla within Saale-Orla-Kreis district
- Interactive map of Langenorla
- Location within Germany Location within Thuringia
- Coordinates: 50°44′N 11°35′E
- Country: Germany
- State: Thuringia
- District: Saale-Orla-Kreis
- Municipal assoc.: Oppurg
- Subdivisions: 3

Government
  - Mayor (2020–26): Lars Fröhlich

Area
  - Total: 22.71 km^{2} (8.77 sq mi)
- Elevation: 185 m (607 ft)

Population (2025-12-31)
  - Total: 1,177
  - Density: 51.83/km^{2} (134.2/sq mi)
- Time zone: UTC+01:00 (CET)
  - Summer (DST): UTC+02:00 (CEST)
- Postal codes: 07381
- Dialling codes: 03647
- Vehicle registration: SOK
- Website: www.vg-oppurg.de

Langenorla is a municipality in the district Saale-Orla-Kreis, in Thuringia, Germany.
