= Geroda, Thuringia =

Geroda
- Municipality
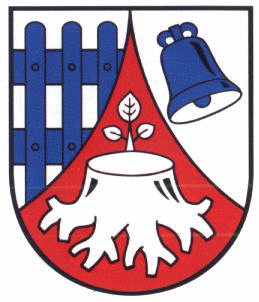
- Coat of arms

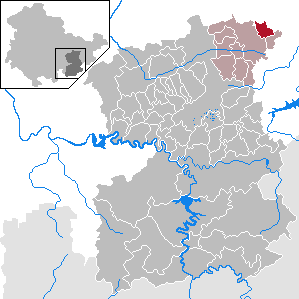
- Location of Geroda within Saale-Orla-Kreis district
- Interactive map of Geroda
- Location within Germany Location within Thuringia
- Coordinates: 50°46′N 11°54′E
- Country: Germany
- State: Thuringia
- District: Saale-Orla-Kreis
- Municipal assoc.: Triptis
- Subdivisions: 3

Government
  - Mayor (2021–27): Gabriele Klauß

Area
  - Total: 6.10 km^{2} (2.36 sq mi)
- Elevation: 343 m (1,125 ft)

Population (2025-12-31)
  - Total: 221
  - Density: 36.2/km^{2} (93.8/sq mi)
- Time zone: UTC+01:00 (CET)
  - Summer (DST): UTC+02:00 (CEST)
- Postal codes: 07819
- Dialling codes: 036482
- Vehicle registration: SOK
- Website: www.triptis.de

Geroda is a municipality in the district Saale-Orla-Kreis, in Thuringia, Germany. The town is a member of the municipal association Triptis.
