= Wernburg =

- Municipality
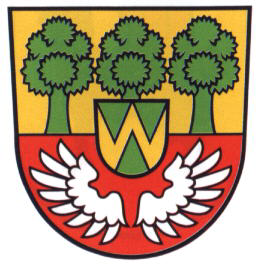
- Coat of arms

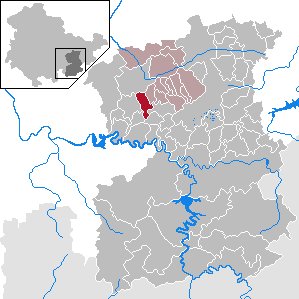
- Location of Wernburg within Saale-Orla-Kreis district
- Interactive map of Wernburg
- Location within Germany Location within Thuringia
- Coordinates: 50°40′36″N 11°36′8″E
- Country: Germany
- State: Thuringia
- District: Saale-Orla-Kreis
- Municipal assoc.: Oppurg

Government
  - Mayor (2020–26): Angela Sprigade

Area
  - Total: 6.9 km^{2} (2.7 sq mi)
- Elevation: 340 m (1,120 ft)

Population (2025-12-31)
  - Total: 614
  - Density: 89/km^{2} (230/sq mi)
- Time zone: UTC+01:00 (CET)
  - Summer (DST): UTC+02:00 (CEST)
- Postal codes: 07381
- Dialling codes: 03647
- Vehicle registration: SOK
- Website: www.wernburg.de

Wernburg (German pronunciation: [ˈvɛʁnbʊʁk]) is a municipality in the district Saale-Orla-Kreis, in Thuringia, Germany.

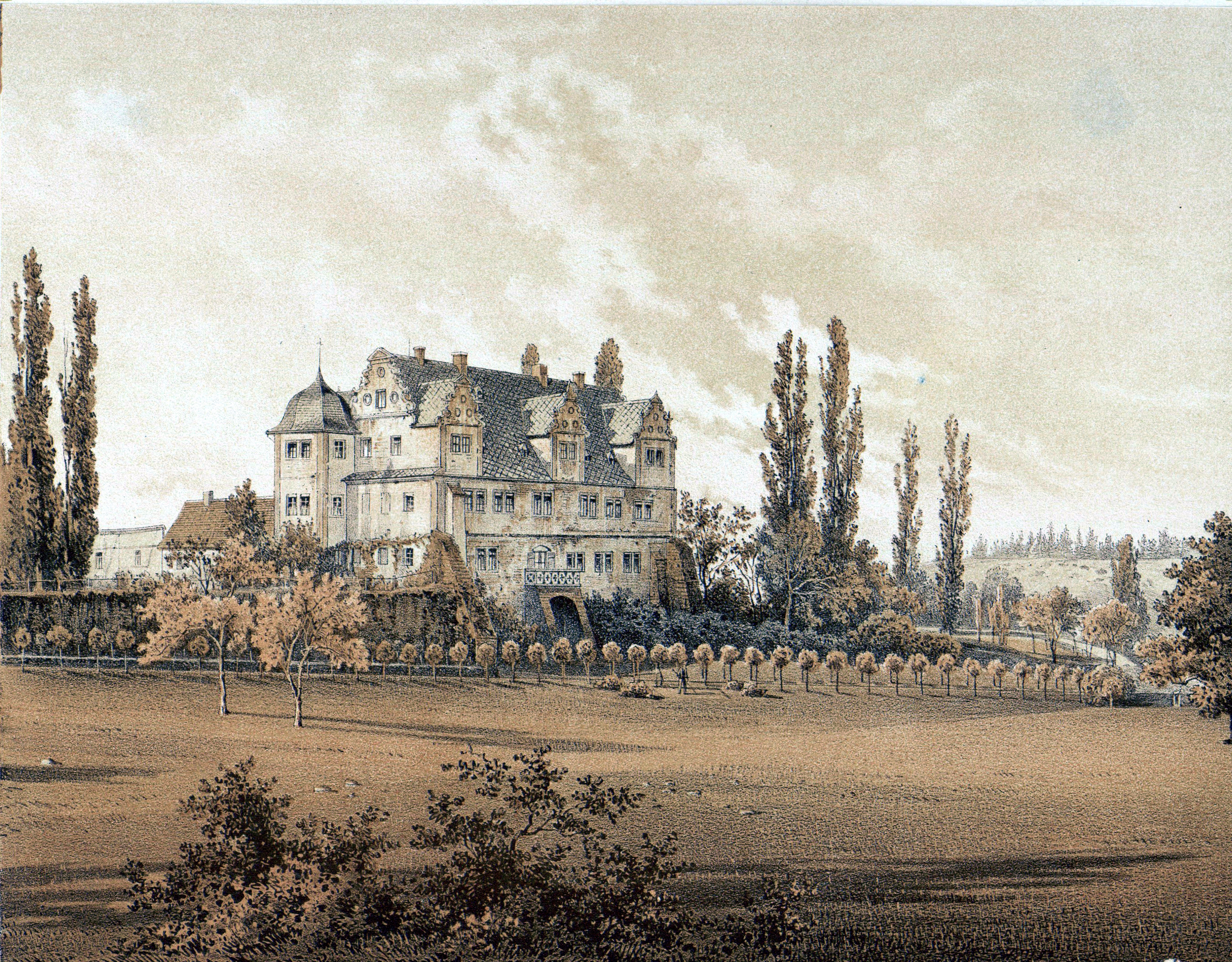
Palace Wernburg, around 1860, Edition by Alexander Duncker
