= Schmieritz =

- Municipality
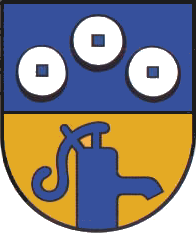
- Coat of arms

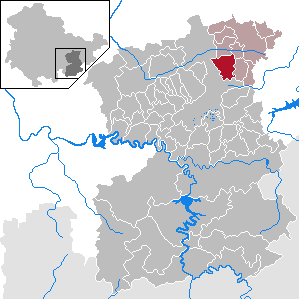
- Location of Schmieritz within Saale-Orla-Kreis district
- Interactive map of Schmieritz
- Location within Germany Location within Thuringia
- Coordinates: 50°43′21″N 11°47′55″E
- Country: Germany
- State: Thuringia
- District: Saale-Orla-Kreis
- Municipal assoc.: Triptis
- Subdivisions: 3

Government
  - Mayor (2022–28): Frank Seidel

Area
  - Total: 11.43 km^{2} (4.41 sq mi)
- Elevation: 410 m (1,350 ft)

Population (2025-12-31)
  - Total: 376
  - Density: 32.9/km^{2} (85.2/sq mi)
- Time zone: UTC+01:00 (CET)
  - Summer (DST): UTC+02:00 (CEST)
- Postal codes: 07819
- Dialling codes: 036481
- Vehicle registration: SOK
- Website: www.triptis.de

Schmieritz (German pronunciation: [ˈʃmiːʁɪts]) is a municipality in the district Saale-Orla-Kreis, in Thuringia, Germany. The town is a member of the municipal association Triptis.
