= Triptis (Verwaltungsgemeinschaft) =

Municipality in Thuringia, Germany

- Verwaltungsgemeinschaft
- Map of Saale-Orla-Kreis highlighting Triptis
- Interactive map of Triptis
- Location within Germany Location within Thuringia
- Coordinates: 50°44′N 11°50′E
- Country: Germany
- State: Thuringia
- District: Saale-Orla-Kreis
- Seat: Triptis
- Subdivisions: 9 municipalities

Area
  - Total: 88.08 km^{2} (34.01 sq mi)

Population (2025-12-31)
  - Total: 5,793
  - Density: 65.77/km^{2} (170.3/sq mi)
- Time zone: UTC+01:00 (CET)
  - Summer (DST): UTC+02:00 (CEST)
- Website: www.triptis.de

Triptis is a Verwaltungsgemeinschaft ("collective municipality") in the district Saale-Orla-Kreis, in Thuringia, Germany. The seat of the Verwaltungsgemeinschaft is in Triptis.

The Verwaltungsgemeinschaft Triptis consists of the following municipalities:

1. Dreitzsch
2. Geroda
3. Lemnitz
4. Miesitz
5. Mittelpöllnitz
6. Rosendorf
7. Schmieritz
8. Tömmelsdorf
9. Triptis
