= Göschitz =

- Municipality
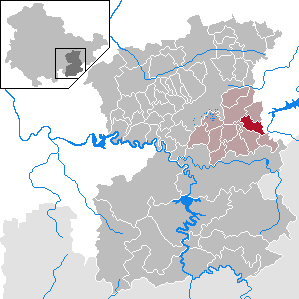
- Location of Göschitz within Saale-Orla-Kreis district
- Interactive map of Göschitz
- Location within Germany Location within Thuringia
- Coordinates: 50°37′33″N 11°52′5″E
- Country: Germany
- State: Thuringia
- District: Saale-Orla-Kreis
- Municipal assoc.: Seenplatte

Government
  - Mayor (2022–28): Christof Plöthner

Area
  - Total: 7.83 km^{2} (3.02 sq mi)
- Elevation: 402 m (1,319 ft)

Population (2025-12-31)
  - Total: 205
  - Density: 26.2/km^{2} (67.8/sq mi)
- Time zone: UTC+01:00 (CET)
  - Summer (DST): UTC+02:00 (CEST)
- Postal codes: 07907
- Dialling codes: 03663
- Vehicle registration: SOK

Göschitz (German pronunciation: [ˈɡœʃɪts]) is a municipality in the district Saale-Orla-Kreis, in Thuringia, Germany.
