= Lausnitz =

Lausnitz bei Neustadt an der Orla
- Municipality
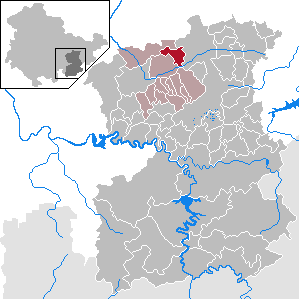
- Location of Lausnitz bei Neustadt an der Orla within Saale-Orla-Kreis district
- Interactive map of Lausnitz bei Neustadt an der Orla
- Location within Germany Location within Thuringia
- Coordinates: 50°43′45″N 11°41′27″E
- Country: Germany
- State: Thuringia
- District: Saale-Orla-Kreis
- Municipal assoc.: Oppurg

Government
  - Mayor (2019–25): Wolfgang Ritter

Area
  - Total: 8.55 km^{2} (3.30 sq mi)
- Elevation: 250 m (820 ft)

Population (2025-12-31)
  - Total: 293
  - Density: 34.3/km^{2} (88.8/sq mi)
- Time zone: UTC+01:00 (CET)
  - Summer (DST): UTC+02:00 (CEST)
- Postal codes: 07806
- Dialling codes: 036481
- Vehicle registration: SOK
- Website: www.vg-oppurg.de

Lausnitz bei Neustadt an der Orla (German pronunciation: [ˈlaʊsnɪts baɪ ˈnɔʏʃtat ʔan deːɐ̯ ˈʔɔʁla], lit. 'Lausnitz near Neustadt an der Orla') is a municipality in the district Saale-Orla-Kreis, in Thuringia, Germany. It lies 4 km west of Neustadt an der Orla.
