= Tömmelsdorf =

- Municipality
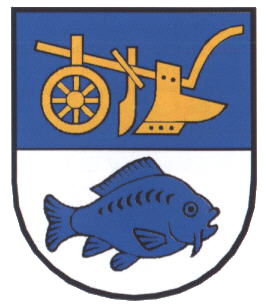
- Coat of arms

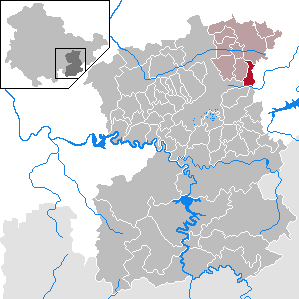
- Location of Tömmelsdorf within Saale-Orla-Kreis district
- Interactive map of Tömmelsdorf
- Location within Germany Location within Thuringia
- Coordinates: 50°43′N 11°52′E
- Country: Germany
- State: Thuringia
- District: Saale-Orla-Kreis
- Municipal assoc.: Triptis

Government
  - Mayor (2022–28): Michael Preußer

Area
  - Total: 6.37 km^{2} (2.46 sq mi)
- Elevation: 400 m (1,300 ft)

Population (2025-12-31)
  - Total: 120
  - Density: 19/km^{2} (49/sq mi)
- Time zone: UTC+01:00 (CET)
  - Summer (DST): UTC+02:00 (CEST)
- Postal codes: 07819
- Dialling codes: 036482
- Vehicle registration: SOK
- Website: www.triptis.de

Tömmelsdorf (German pronunciation: [ˈtœml̩sdɔʁf]) is a municipality in the district Saale-Orla-Kreis, in Thuringia, Germany. The town is a member of the municipal association Triptis.
