= Döbritz =

- Municipality
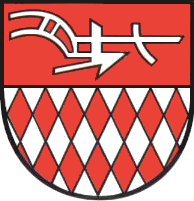
- Coat of arms

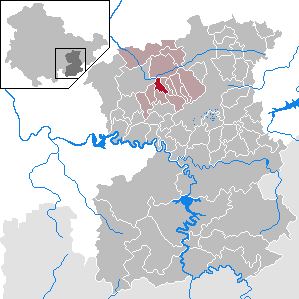
- Location of Döbritz within Saale-Orla-Kreis district
- Interactive map of Döbritz
- Location within Germany Location within Thuringia
- Coordinates: 50°42′N 11°39′E
- Country: Germany
- State: Thuringia
- District: Saale-Orla-Kreis
- Municipal assoc.: Oppurg

Government
  - Mayor (2021–27): Torsten Rückel

Area
  - Total: 3.11 km^{2} (1.20 sq mi)
- Elevation: 260 m (850 ft)

Population (2025-12-31)
  - Total: 185
  - Density: 59.5/km^{2} (154/sq mi)
- Time zone: UTC+01:00 (CET)
  - Summer (DST): UTC+02:00 (CEST)
- Postal codes: 07381
- Dialling codes: 03647
- Vehicle registration: SOK

Döbritz is a municipality in the district Saale-Orla-Kreis, in Thuringia, Germany.
