= Nimritz =

- Municipality
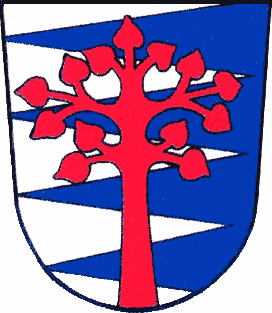
- Coat of arms

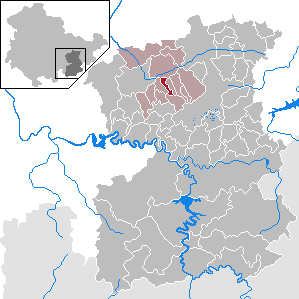
- Location of Nimritz within Saale-Orla-Kreis district
- Interactive map of Nimritz
- Location within Germany Location within Thuringia
- Coordinates: 50°42′0″N 11°39′07″E
- Country: Germany
- State: Thuringia
- District: Saale-Orla-Kreis
- Municipal assoc.: Oppurg

Government
  - Mayor (2020–26): Lars Meinhold

Area
  - Total: 2.12 km^{2} (0.82 sq mi)
- Elevation: 255 m (837 ft)

Population (2025-12-31)
  - Total: 352
  - Density: 166/km^{2} (430/sq mi)
- Time zone: UTC+01:00 (CET)
  - Summer (DST): UTC+02:00 (CEST)
- Postal codes: 07381
- Dialling codes: 03647
- Vehicle registration: SOK
- Website: www.vg-oppurg.de

Nimritz is a municipality in the district Saale-Orla-Kreis, in Thuringia, Germany.
