= Grobengereuth =

- Municipality
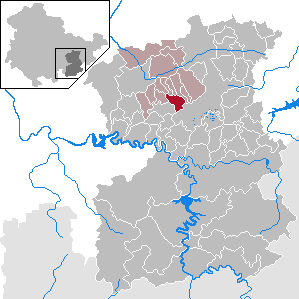
- Location of Grobengereuth within Saale-Orla-Kreis district
- Interactive map of Grobengereuth
- Location within Germany Location within Thuringia
- Coordinates: 50°40′8″N 11°40′8″E
- Country: Germany
- State: Thuringia
- District: Saale-Orla-Kreis
- Municipal assoc.: Oppurg

Government
  - Mayor (2022–28): Martina Grau

Area
  - Total: 5.65 km^{2} (2.18 sq mi)
- Elevation: 470 m (1,540 ft)

Population (2025-12-31)
  - Total: 186
  - Density: 32.9/km^{2} (85.3/sq mi)
- Time zone: UTC+01:00 (CET)
  - Summer (DST): UTC+02:00 (CEST)
- Postal codes: 07389
- Dialling codes: 036484
- Vehicle registration: SOK
- Website: www.vg-oppurg.de

Grobengereuth is a municipality in the district Saale-Orla-Kreis, in Thuringia, Germany.
