= Kospoda =

- Municipality
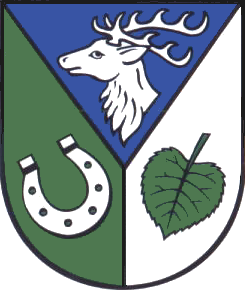
- Coat of arms

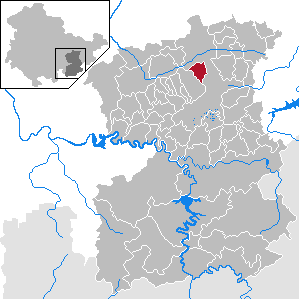
- Location of Kospoda within Saale-Orla-Kreis district
- Interactive map of Kospoda
- Location within Germany Location within Thuringia
- Coordinates: 50°43′6″N 11°44′19″E
- Country: Germany
- State: Thuringia
- District: Saale-Orla-Kreis

Government
  - Mayor (2024–30): Elsa Fischer

Area
  - Total: 6.14 km^{2} (2.37 sq mi)
- Elevation: 340 m (1,120 ft)

Population (2025-12-31)
  - Total: 388
  - Density: 63.2/km^{2} (164/sq mi)
- Time zone: UTC+01:00 (CET)
  - Summer (DST): UTC+02:00 (CEST)
- Postal codes: 07806
- Dialling codes: 036481
- Vehicle registration: SOK
- Website: kospoda.de

Kospoda is a municipality in the district Saale-Orla-Kreis, in Thuringia, Germany.
