= Seenplatte =

Municipality in Thuringia, Germany

- Verwaltungsgemeinschaft
- Map of Saale-Orla-Kreis highlighting Seenplatte
- Interactive map of Seenplatte
- Location within Germany Location within Thuringia
- Coordinates: 50°39′N 11°47′E
- Country: Germany
- State: Thuringia
- District: Saale-Orla-Kreis
- Seat: Oettersdorf
- Subdivisions: 12 municipalities

Area
  - Total: 105.13 km^{2} (40.59 sq mi)

Population (2025-12-31)
  - Total: 3,889
  - Density: 36.99/km^{2} (95.81/sq mi)
- Time zone: UTC+01:00 (CET)
  - Summer (DST): UTC+02:00 (CEST)
- Website: vg-seenplatte.de

Seenplatte is a Verwaltungsgemeinschaft ("collective municipality") in the district Saale-Orla-Kreis, in Thuringia, Germany. The seat of the Verwaltungsgemeinschaft is in Oettersdorf.

The Verwaltungsgemeinschaft Seenplatte consists of fourteen municipalities:

- Dittersdorf
- Görkwitz
- Göschitz
- Kirschkau
- Löhma
- Moßbach
- Neundorf bei Schleiz
- Oettersdorf
- Plothen
- Pörmitz
- Tegau
- Volkmannsdorf
