= Oberoppurg =

- Municipality
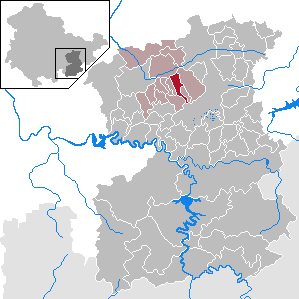
- Location of Oberoppurg within Saale-Orla-Kreis district
- Interactive map of Oberoppurg
- Location within Germany Location within Thuringia
- Coordinates: 50°41′N 11°41′E
- Country: Germany
- State: Thuringia
- District: Saale-Orla-Kreis
- Municipal assoc.: Oppurg

Government
  - Mayor (2022–28): Werner Böhme

Area
  - Total: 5.03 km^{2} (1.94 sq mi)
- Elevation: 340 m (1,120 ft)

Population (2025-12-31)
  - Total: 149
  - Density: 29.6/km^{2} (76.7/sq mi)
- Time zone: UTC+01:00 (CET)
  - Summer (DST): UTC+02:00 (CEST)
- Postal codes: 07381
- Dialling codes: 03647
- Vehicle registration: SOK
- Website: www.vg-oppurg.de

Oberoppurg is a municipality in the district Saale-Orla-Kreis, in Thuringia, Germany.
