= Remptendorf =

- Municipality
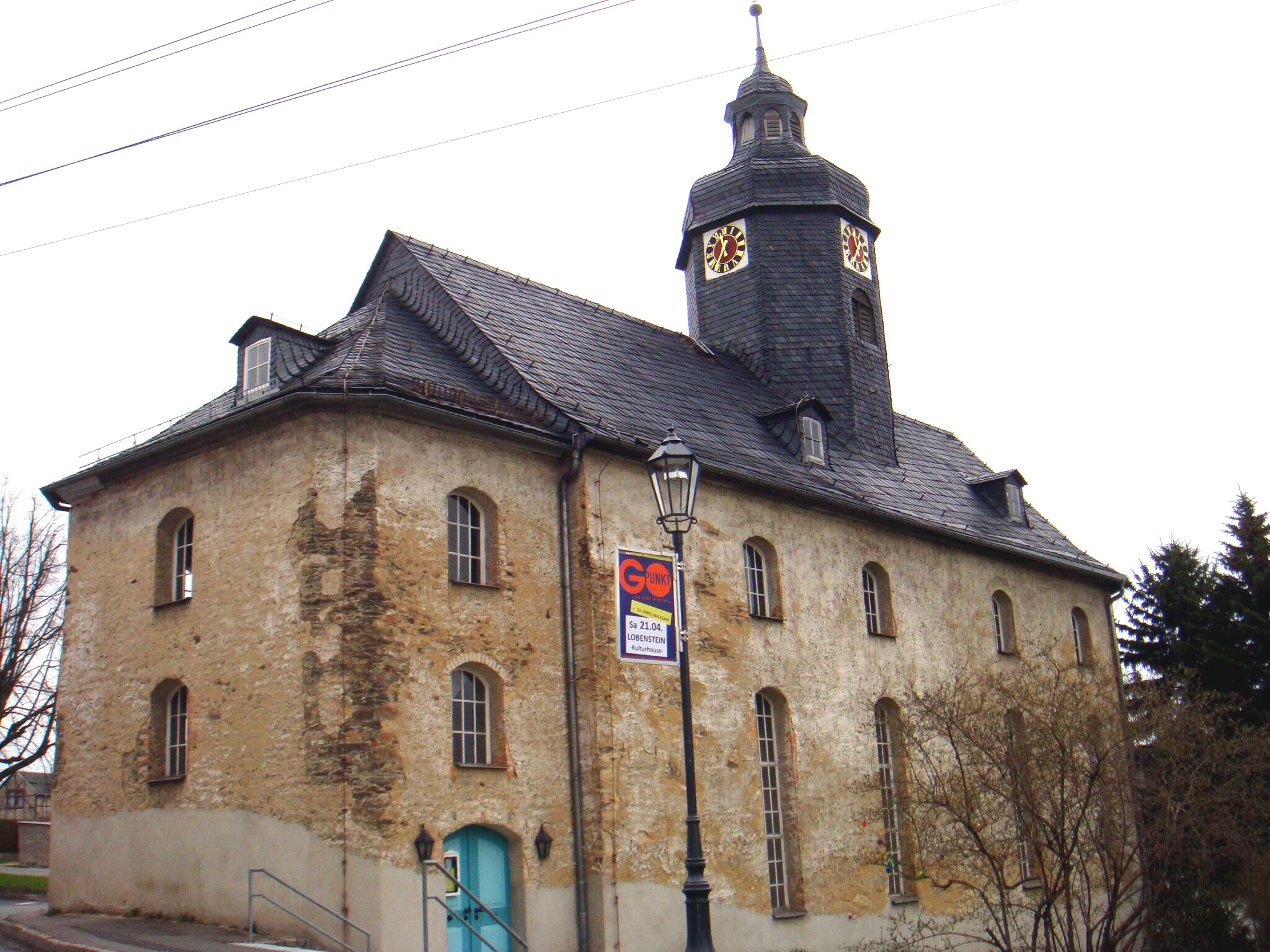
- Protestant church

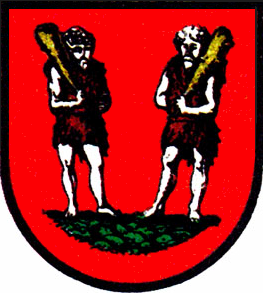
- Coat of arms

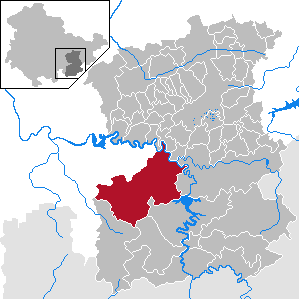
- Location of Remptendorf within Saale-Orla-Kreis district
- Interactive map of Remptendorf
- Location within Germany Location within Thuringia
- Coordinates: 50°32′N 11°39′E
- Country: Germany
- State: Thuringia
- District: Saale-Orla-Kreis
- Subdivisions: 17

Government
  - Mayor (2023–29): Tino König (CDU)

Area
  - Total: 97.81 km^{2} (37.76 sq mi)
- Elevation: 490 m (1,610 ft)

Population (2025-12-31)
  - Total: 3,090
  - Density: 31.6/km^{2} (81.8/sq mi)
- Time zone: UTC+01:00 (CET)
  - Summer (DST): UTC+02:00 (CEST)
- Postal codes: 07368
- Dialling codes: 036640
- Vehicle registration: SOK
- Website: www.remptendorf.de

Remptendorf (German pronunciation: [ˈʁɛmptn̩dɔʁf]) is a municipality in the district Saale-Orla-Kreis, in Thuringia, Germany.
