= Mittelpöllnitz =

- Municipality
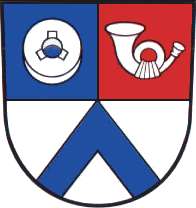
- Coat of arms

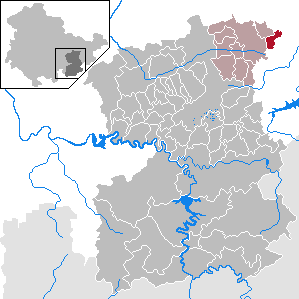
- Location of Mittelpöllnitz within Saale-Orla-Kreis district
- Interactive map of Mittelpöllnitz
- Location within Germany Location within Thuringia
- Coordinates: 50°45′N 11°55′E
- Country: Germany
- State: Thuringia
- District: Saale-Orla-Kreis
- Municipal assoc.: Triptis
- Subdivisions: 2

Government
  - Mayor (2023–29): Luise Düsing

Area
  - Total: 5.01 km^{2} (1.93 sq mi)
- Elevation: 335 m (1,099 ft)

Population (2025-12-31)
  - Total: 271
  - Density: 54.1/km^{2} (140/sq mi)
- Time zone: UTC+01:00 (CET)
  - Summer (DST): UTC+02:00 (CEST)
- Postal codes: 07819
- Dialling codes: 036482
- Vehicle registration: SOK
- Website: www.mittelpoellnitz.de

Mittelpöllnitz is a municipality in the district Saale-Orla-Kreis, in Thuringia, Germany. The town is a member of the municipal association Triptis.

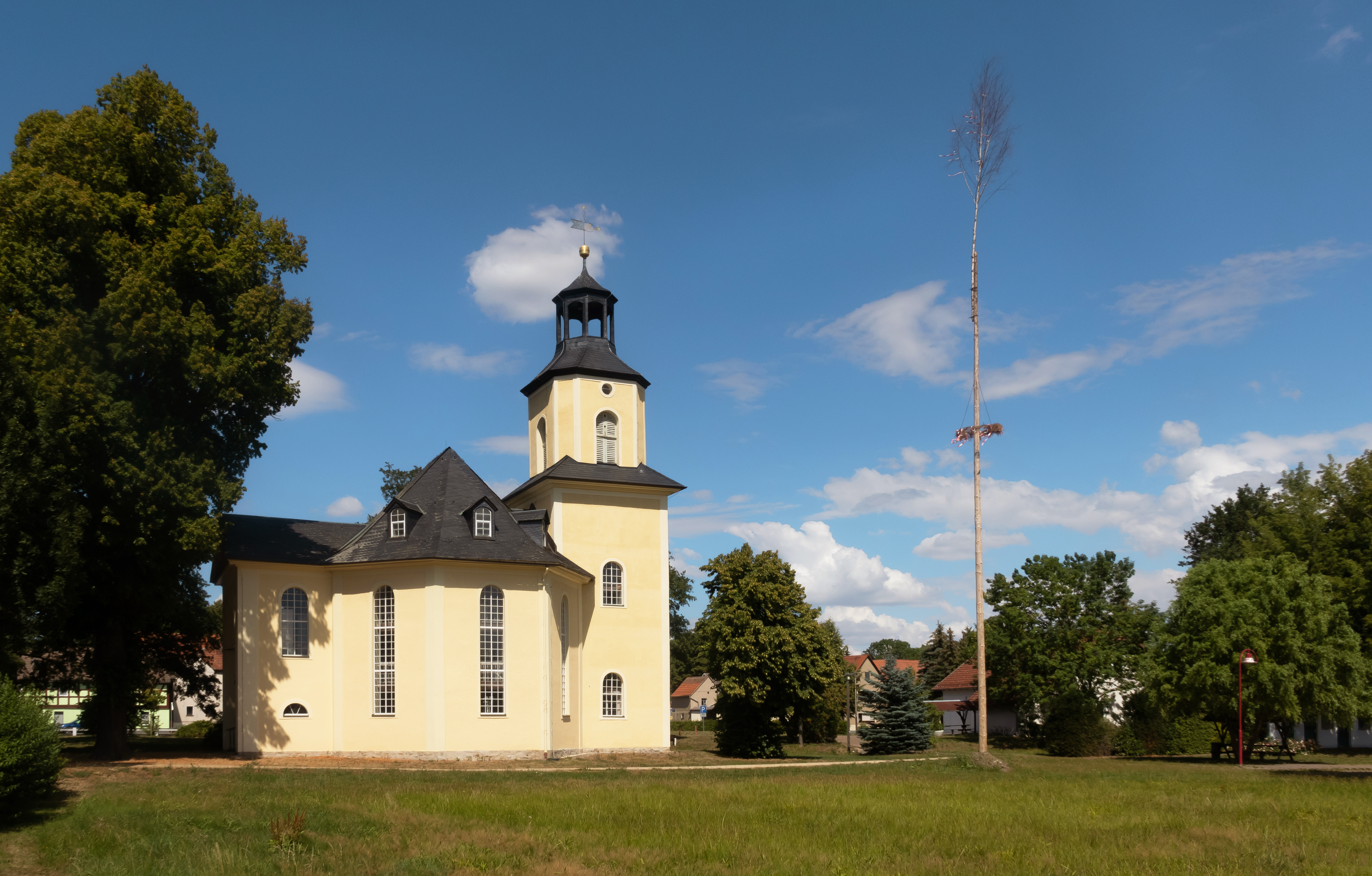
Mittelpöllnitz, church

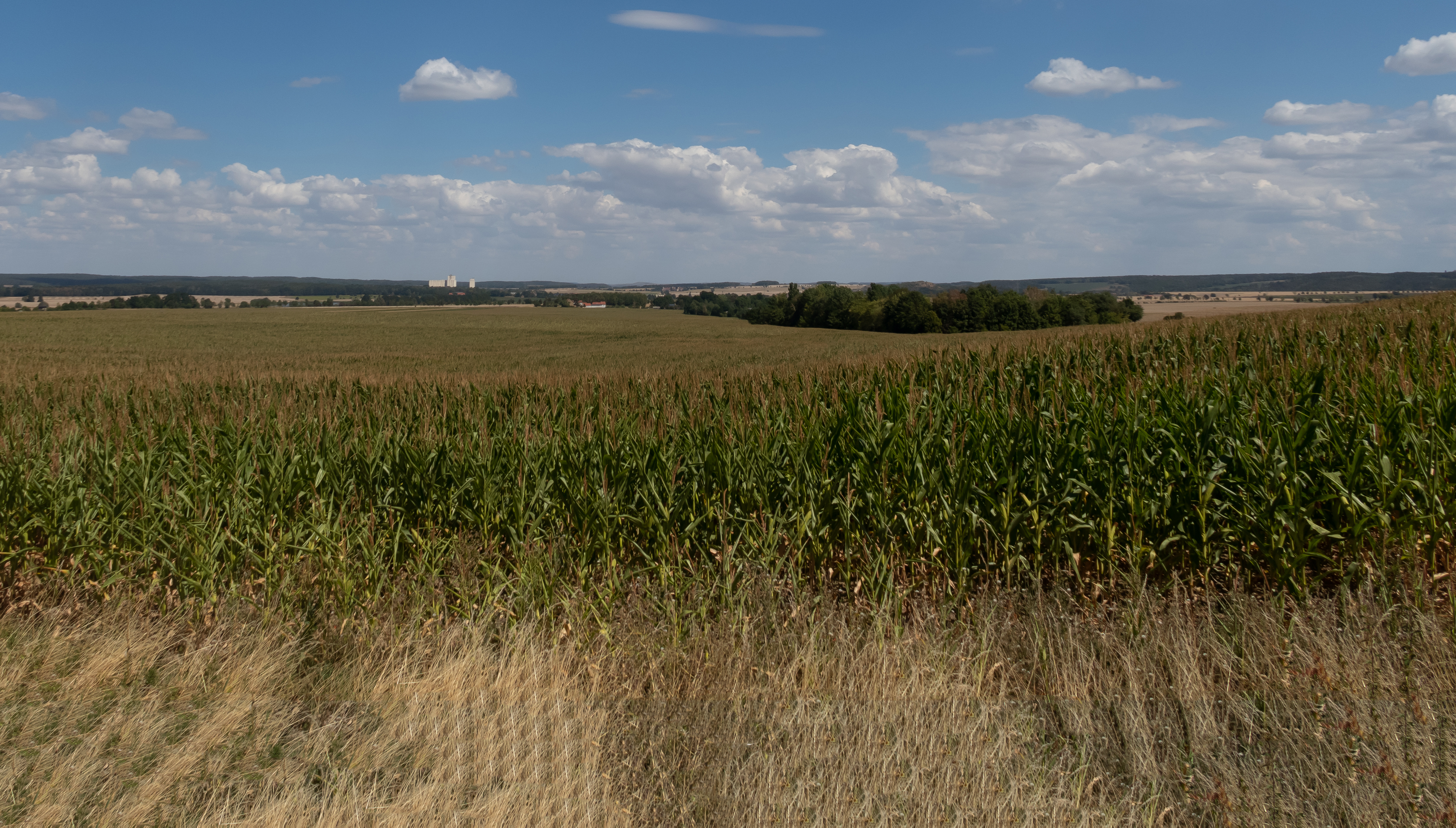
Panorama between Mittelpöllnitz and Braunsdor
