= Dreitzsch =

- Municipality
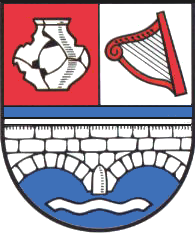
- Coat of arms

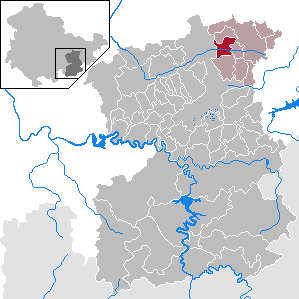
- Location of Dreitzsch within Saale-Orla-Kreis district
- Interactive map of Dreitzsch
- Location within Germany Location within Thuringia
- Coordinates: 50°44′N 11°48′E
- Country: Germany
- State: Thuringia
- District: Saale-Orla-Kreis
- Municipal assoc.: Triptis
- Subdivisions: 2

Government
  - Mayor (2022–28): Steffen Timm

Area
  - Total: 7.26 km^{2} (2.80 sq mi)
- Elevation: 310 m (1,020 ft)

Population (2025-12-31)
  - Total: 401
  - Density: 55.2/km^{2} (143/sq mi)
- Time zone: UTC+01:00 (CET)
  - Summer (DST): UTC+02:00 (CEST)
- Postal codes: 07819
- Dialling codes: 036481
- Vehicle registration: SOK
- Website: www.triptis.de

Dreitzsch (German pronunciation: [ˈdʁaɪtʃ]) is a municipality in the district Saale-Orla-Kreis, in Thuringia, Germany. The town is a member of the municipal association Triptis.
