= Kirschkau =

- Municipality
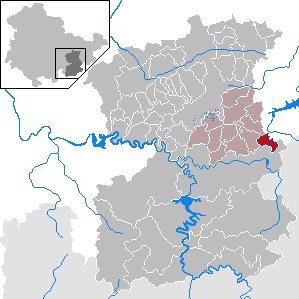
- Location of Kirschkau within Saale-Orla-Kreis district
- Interactive map of Kirschkau
- Location within Germany Location within Thuringia
- Coordinates: 50°36′N 11°54′E
- Country: Germany
- State: Thuringia
- District: Saale-Orla-Kreis
- Municipal assoc.: Seenplatte

Government
  - Mayor (2022–28): André Kerl

Area
  - Total: 6 km^{2} (2.3 sq mi)
- Elevation: 475 m (1,558 ft)

Population (2025-12-31)
  - Total: 191
  - Density: 32/km^{2} (82/sq mi)
- Time zone: UTC+01:00 (CET)
  - Summer (DST): UTC+02:00 (CEST)
- Postal codes: 07919
- Dialling codes: 03663
- Vehicle registration: SOK

Kirschkau (German pronunciation: [ˈkɪʁʃkaʊ]) is a municipality in the district Saale-Orla-Kreis, in Thuringia, Germany.
