= Rosendorf =

- Municipality
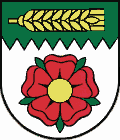
- Coat of arms

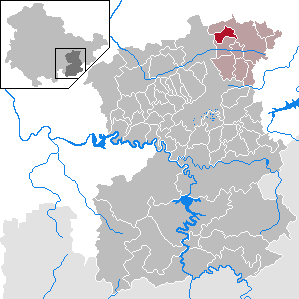
- Location of Rosendorf within Saale-Orla-Kreis district
- Interactive map of Rosendorf
- Location within Germany Location within Thuringia
- Coordinates: 50°46′N 11°46′E
- Country: Germany
- State: Thuringia
- District: Saale-Orla-Kreis
- Municipal assoc.: Triptis

Government
  - Mayor (2022–28): Sabine Gerschner

Area
  - Total: 6.23 km^{2} (2.41 sq mi)
- Elevation: 355 m (1,165 ft)

Population (2025-12-31)
  - Total: 159
  - Density: 25.5/km^{2} (66.1/sq mi)
- Time zone: UTC+01:00 (CET)
  - Summer (DST): UTC+02:00 (CEST)
- Postal codes: 07819
- Dialling codes: 036481
- Vehicle registration: SOK

Rosendorf (German pronunciation: [ˈʁoːzn̩dɔʁf]) is a municipality in the district Saale-Orla-Kreis, in Thuringia, Germany. The town is a member of the municipal association Triptis.
