= Miesitz =

- Municipality
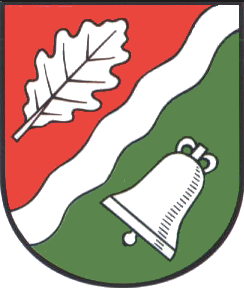
- Coat of arms

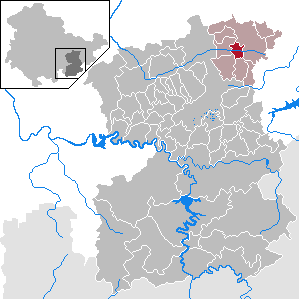
- Location of Miesitz within Saale-Orla-Kreis district
- Interactive map of Miesitz
- Location within Germany Location within Thuringia
- Coordinates: 50°44′28″N 11°50′1″E
- Country: Germany
- State: Thuringia
- District: Saale-Orla-Kreis
- Municipal assoc.: Triptis

Government
  - Mayor (2022–28): Michael Liersch

Area
  - Total: 4.45 km^{2} (1.72 sq mi)
- Elevation: 330 m (1,080 ft)

Population (2025-12-31)
  - Total: 269
  - Density: 60.4/km^{2} (157/sq mi)
- Time zone: UTC+01:00 (CET)
  - Summer (DST): UTC+02:00 (CEST)
- Postal codes: 07819
- Dialling codes: 036482
- Vehicle registration: SOK
- Website: www.triptis.de

Miesitz (German pronunciation: [ˈmiːzɪts]) is a municipality in the district Saale-Orla-Kreis, in Thuringia, Germany. The town is a member of the municipal association Triptis.
