= Oppurg =

- Municipality
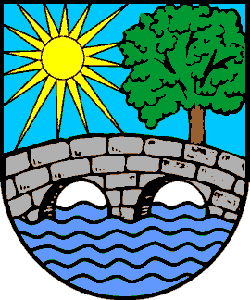
- Coat of arms

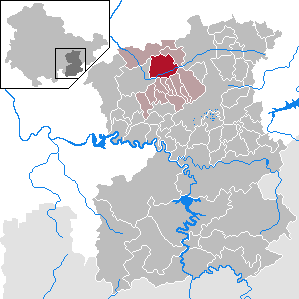
- Location of Oppurg within Saale-Orla-Kreis district
- Interactive map of Oppurg
- Location within Germany Location within Thuringia
- Coordinates: 50°43′N 11°39′E
- Country: Germany
- State: Thuringia
- District: Saale-Orla-Kreis
- Municipal assoc.: Oppurg

Government
  - Mayor (2024–30): Daniel Eberitzsch

Area
  - Total: 15.76 km^{2} (6.08 sq mi)
- Elevation: 230 m (750 ft)

Population (2025-12-31)
  - Total: 1,059
  - Density: 67.20/km^{2} (174.0/sq mi)
- Time zone: UTC+01:00 (CET)
  - Summer (DST): UTC+02:00 (CEST)
- Postal codes: 07381
- Dialling codes: 03647
- Vehicle registration: SOK
- Website: www.vg-oppurg.de

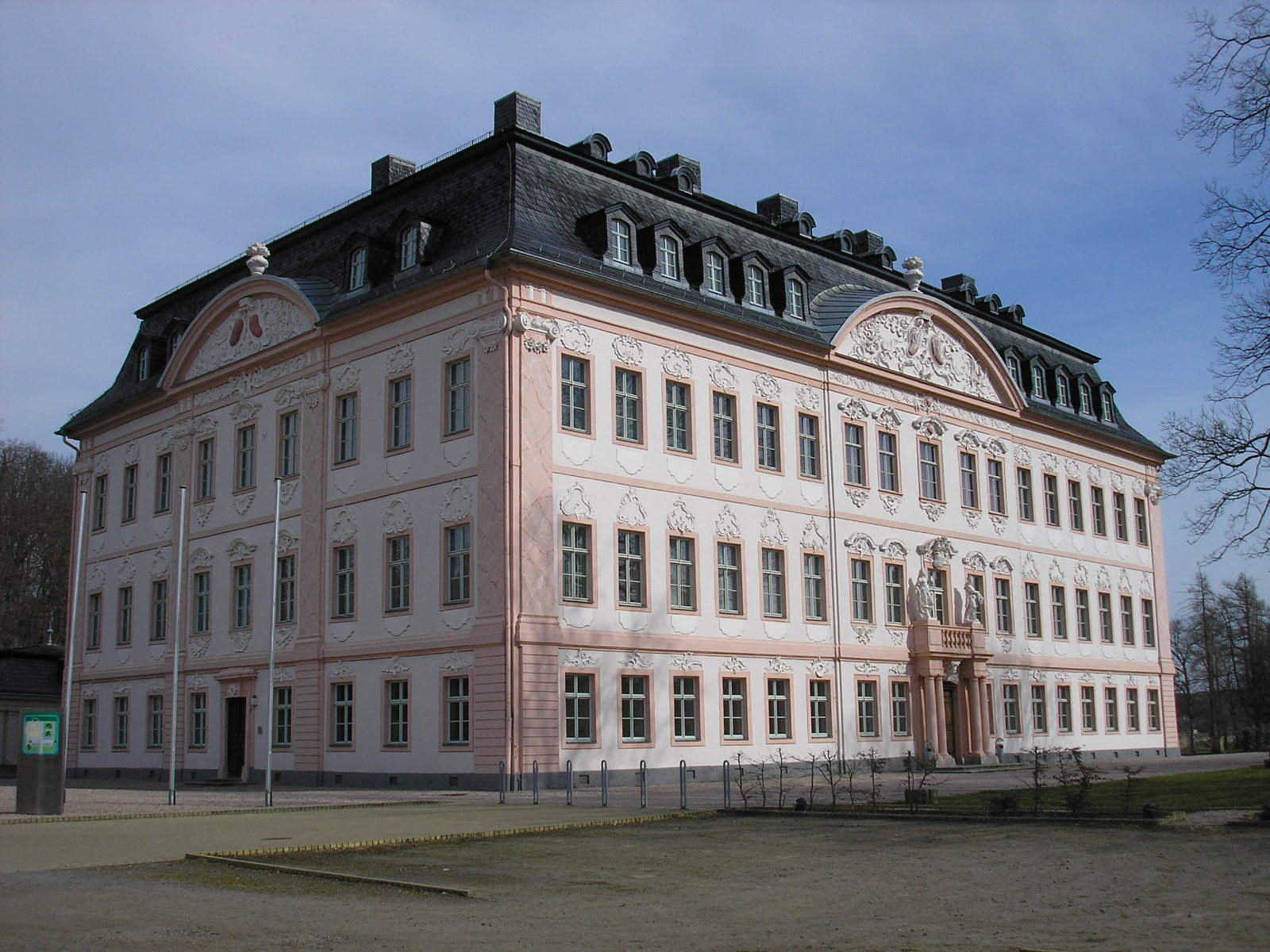
Schloss Oppurg

Oppurg is a municipality in the district of Saale-Orla-Kreis, in Thuringia, Germany.

The main attraction is Schloss Oppurg, an 18th-century mansion which once belonged to Hoym and Hohenlohe families. The princes of Hohenlohe-Oehringen owned the castle up to 1945. Today, it is a hotel.
