= Ringo Mühlmann =

German politician (born 1975)

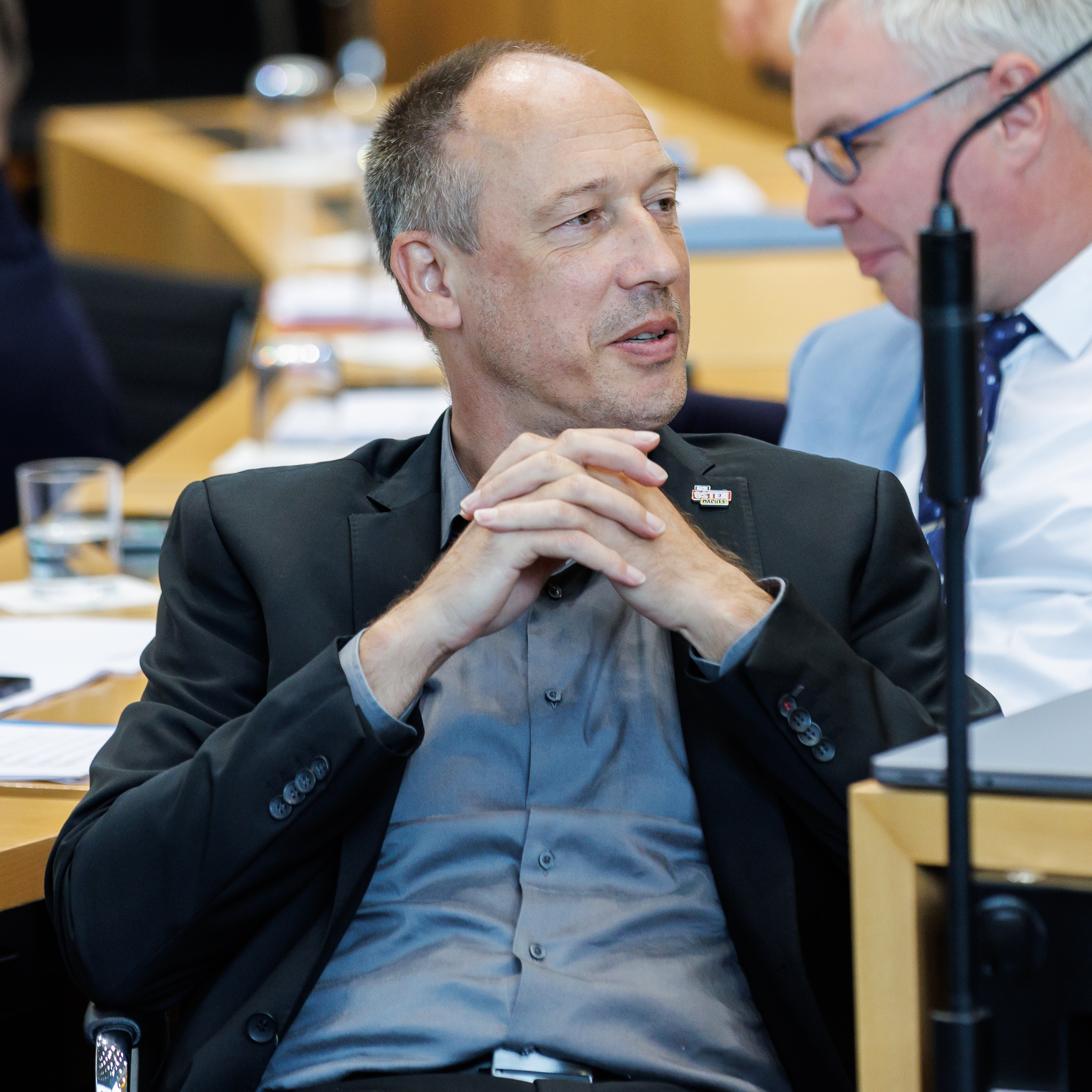
- Mühlmann in 2024

Member of the Landtag of Thuringia
- Incumbent
- Assumed office 26 November 2019
- Constituency: Saale-Orla-Kreis II (since 2024)

Personal details
- Born: 1975 (age 50–51) Pößneck
- Party: Alternative for Germany

Ringo Mühlmann (born 1975 in Pößneck) is a German politician serving as a member of the Landtag of Thuringia since 2019. From 2009 to 2019, he worked as a police officer.
