= Neundorf bei Schleiz =

- Municipality
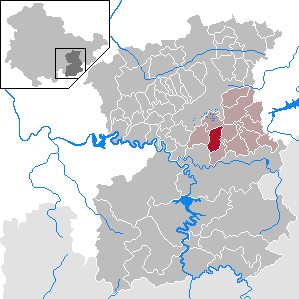
- Location of Neundorf bei Schleiz within Saale-Orla-Kreis district
- Interactive map of Neundorf bei Schleiz
- Location within Germany Location within Thuringia
- Coordinates: 50°36′5″N 11°46′06″E
- Country: Germany
- State: Thuringia
- District: Saale-Orla-Kreis
- Municipal assoc.: Seenplatte

Government
  - Mayor (2022–28): Lutz Heidrich

Area
  - Total: 7.97 km^{2} (3.08 sq mi)
- Elevation: 460 m (1,510 ft)

Population (2025-12-31)
  - Total: 257
  - Density: 32.2/km^{2} (83.5/sq mi)
- Time zone: UTC+01:00 (CET)
  - Summer (DST): UTC+02:00 (CEST)
- Postal codes: 07924
- Dialling codes: 03663
- Vehicle registration: SOK
- Website: vg-seenplatte.de

Neundorf (bei Schleiz) (German pronunciation: [ˈnɔʏndɔʁf]) is a municipality in the district of Saale-Orla, Thuringia, Germany.
