= Gertewitz =

- Municipality
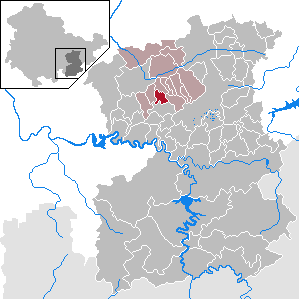
- Location of Gertewitz within Saale-Orla-Kreis district
- Interactive map of Gertewitz
- Location within Germany Location within Thuringia
- Coordinates: 50°40′53″N 11°38′34″E
- Country: Germany
- State: Thuringia
- District: Saale-Orla-Kreis
- Municipal assoc.: Oppurg

Government
  - Mayor (2022–28): Günter Brüsch

Area
  - Total: 4.21 km^{2} (1.63 sq mi)
- Elevation: 358 m (1,175 ft)

Population (2025-12-31)
  - Total: 130
  - Density: 31/km^{2} (80/sq mi)
- Time zone: UTC+01:00 (CET)
  - Summer (DST): UTC+02:00 (CEST)
- Postal codes: 07389
- Dialling codes: 03647
- Vehicle registration: SOK
- Website: www.vg-oppurg.de

Gertewitz (German pronunciation: [ˈɡɛʁtəvɪts]) is a municipality in the district Saale-Orla-Kreis, in Thuringia, Germany.
