= Görkwitz =

- Municipality
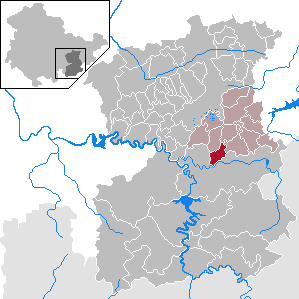
- Location of Görkwitz within Saale-Orla-Kreis district
- Interactive map of Görkwitz
- Location within Germany Location within Thuringia
- Coordinates: 50°35′18″N 11°47′11″E
- Country: Germany
- State: Thuringia
- District: Saale-Orla-Kreis
- Municipal assoc.: Seenplatte

Government
  - Mayor (2022–28): Dieter König

Area
  - Total: 5.85 km^{2} (2.26 sq mi)
- Elevation: 426 m (1,398 ft)

Population (2025-12-31)
  - Total: 305
  - Density: 52.1/km^{2} (135/sq mi)
- Time zone: UTC+01:00 (CET)
  - Summer (DST): UTC+02:00 (CEST)
- Postal codes: 07907
- Dialling codes: 03663
- Vehicle registration: SOK
- Website: www.vg-seenplatte.de

Görkwitz (German pronunciation: [ˈɡœʁkvɪts]) is a municipality in the district Saale-Orla-Kreis, in Thuringia, Germany.
