= Solkwitz =

- Municipality
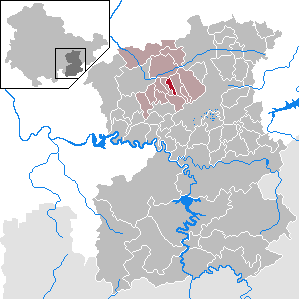
- Location of Solkwitz within Saale-Orla-Kreis district
- Interactive map of Solkwitz
- Location within Germany Location within Thuringia
- Coordinates: 50°41′49″N 11°39′59″E
- Country: Germany
- State: Thuringia
- District: Saale-Orla-Kreis
- Municipal assoc.: Oppurg

Government
  - Mayor (2023–29): Christian Schaar

Area
  - Total: 2.2 km^{2} (0.85 sq mi)
- Elevation: 315 m (1,033 ft)

Population (2025-12-31)
  - Total: 57
  - Density: 26/km^{2} (67/sq mi)
- Time zone: UTC+01:00 (CET)
  - Summer (DST): UTC+02:00 (CEST)
- Postal codes: 07381
- Dialling codes: 03647
- Vehicle registration: SOK
- Website: www.vg-oppurg.de

Solkwitz (German pronunciation: [ˈzɔlkvɪts]) is a municipality in the district Saale-Orla-Kreis, in Thuringia, Germany.
