= Quaschwitz =

- Municipality
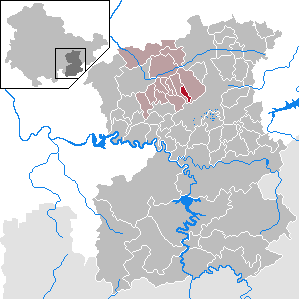
- Location of Quaschwitz within Saale-Orla-Kreis district
- Interactive map of Quaschwitz
- Location within Germany Location within Thuringia
- Coordinates: 50°41′N 11°42′E
- Country: Germany
- State: Thuringia
- District: Saale-Orla-Kreis
- Municipal assoc.: Oppurg

Government
  - Mayor (2022–28): Sibylle Seelmann

Area
  - Total: 2.29 km^{2} (0.88 sq mi)
- Elevation: 455 m (1,493 ft)

Population (2025-12-31)
  - Total: 68
  - Density: 30/km^{2} (77/sq mi)
- Time zone: UTC+01:00 (CET)
  - Summer (DST): UTC+02:00 (CEST)
- Postal codes: 07389
- Dialling codes: 036484
- Vehicle registration: SOK

Quaschwitz (German pronunciation: [ˈkvaʃvɪts]) is a municipality in the district Saale-Orla-Kreis, Thuringia, Germany.
