= Christian Herrgott =

German politician (born 1984)

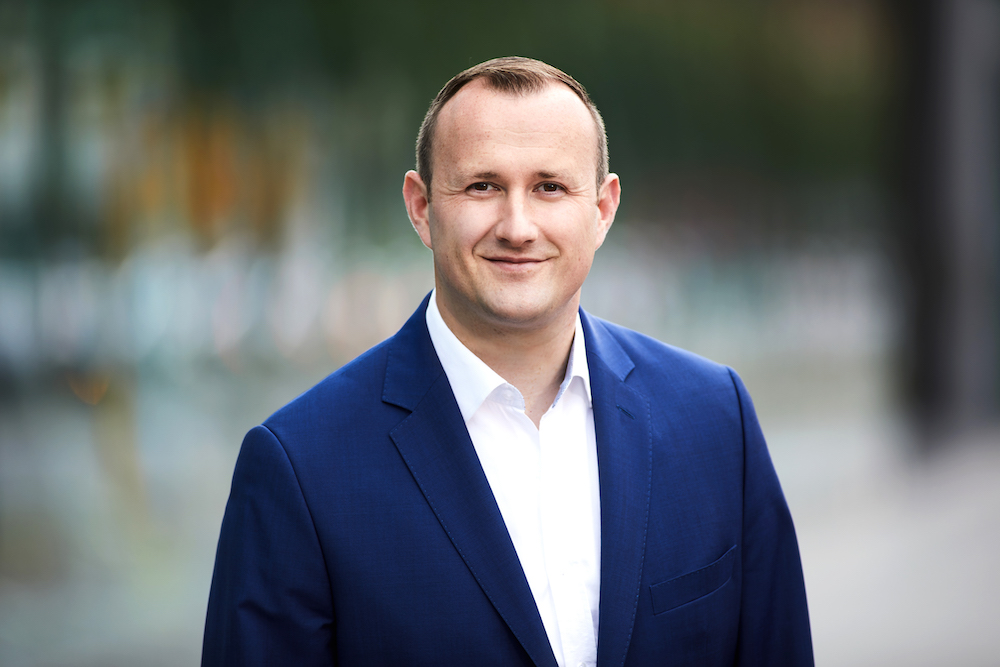
- Herrgott in 2019

Landrat of Saale-Orla
- Incumbent
- Assumed office 9 February 2024
- Preceded by: Thomas Fügmann
- Constituency: Saale-Orla-Kreis II

Member of the Landtag of Thuringia
- In office 14 October 2014 – 12 March 2024
- Preceded by: Heidrun Sedlacik
- Succeeded by: Regina Polster

Personal details
- Born: 28 August 1984 (age 41) Schleiz
- Party: Christian Democratic Union (since 2000)

Christian Herrgott (born 28 August 1984 in Schleiz) is a German politician serving as Landrat of Saale-Orla since 2024. From 2014 to 2024, he was a member of the Landtag of Thuringia.
