= Oppurg (Verwaltungsgemeinschaft) =

Municipal association in Thuringia, Germany

- Verwaltungsgemeinschaft
- Map of Saale-Orla-Kreis highlighting Oppurg
- Interactive map of Oppurg
- Location within Germany Location within Thuringia
- Coordinates: 50°42′N 11°39′E
- Country: Germany
- State: Thuringia
- District: Saale-Orla-Kreis
- Seat: Oppurg
- Subdivisions: 13 municipalities

Area
  - Total: 97.98 km^{2} (37.83 sq mi)

Population (2025-12-31)
  - Total: 5,204
  - Density: 53.11/km^{2} (137.6/sq mi)
- Time zone: UTC+01:00 (CET)
  - Summer (DST): UTC+02:00 (CEST)
- Website: www.vg-oppurg.de

Oppurg is a Verwaltungsgemeinschaft ("collective municipality") in the district Saale-Orla-Kreis, in Thuringia, Germany. The seat of the Verwaltungsgemeinschaft is in Oppurg.

The Verwaltungsgemeinschaft Oppurg consists of the following municipalities:

1. Bodelwitz
2. Döbritz
3. Gertewitz
4. Grobengereuth
5. Langenorla
6. Lausnitz
7. Nimritz
8. Oberoppurg
9. Oppurg
10. Quaschwitz
11. Solkwitz
12. Weira
13. Wernburg
