= Löhma =

- Municipality
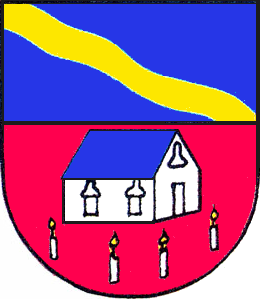
- Coat of arms

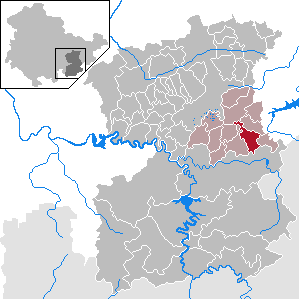
- Location of Löhma within Saale-Orla-Kreis district
- Interactive map of Löhma
- Location within Germany Location within Thuringia
- Coordinates: 50°36′42″N 11°51′6″E
- Country: Germany
- State: Thuringia
- District: Saale-Orla-Kreis
- Municipal assoc.: Seenplatte

Government
  - Mayor (2021–27): Christian Kolbe

Area
  - Total: 10.46 km^{2} (4.04 sq mi)
- Elevation: 430 m (1,410 ft)

Population (2025-12-31)
  - Total: 264
  - Density: 25.2/km^{2} (65.4/sq mi)
- Time zone: UTC+01:00 (CET)
  - Summer (DST): UTC+02:00 (CEST)
- Postal codes: 07907
- Dialling codes: 03663
- Vehicle registration: SOK
- Website: www.vg-seenplatte.de

Löhma (German pronunciation: [ˈløːma]) is a municipality in the district Saale-Orla-Kreis, in Thuringia, Germany.
