= Bodelwitz =

- Municipality
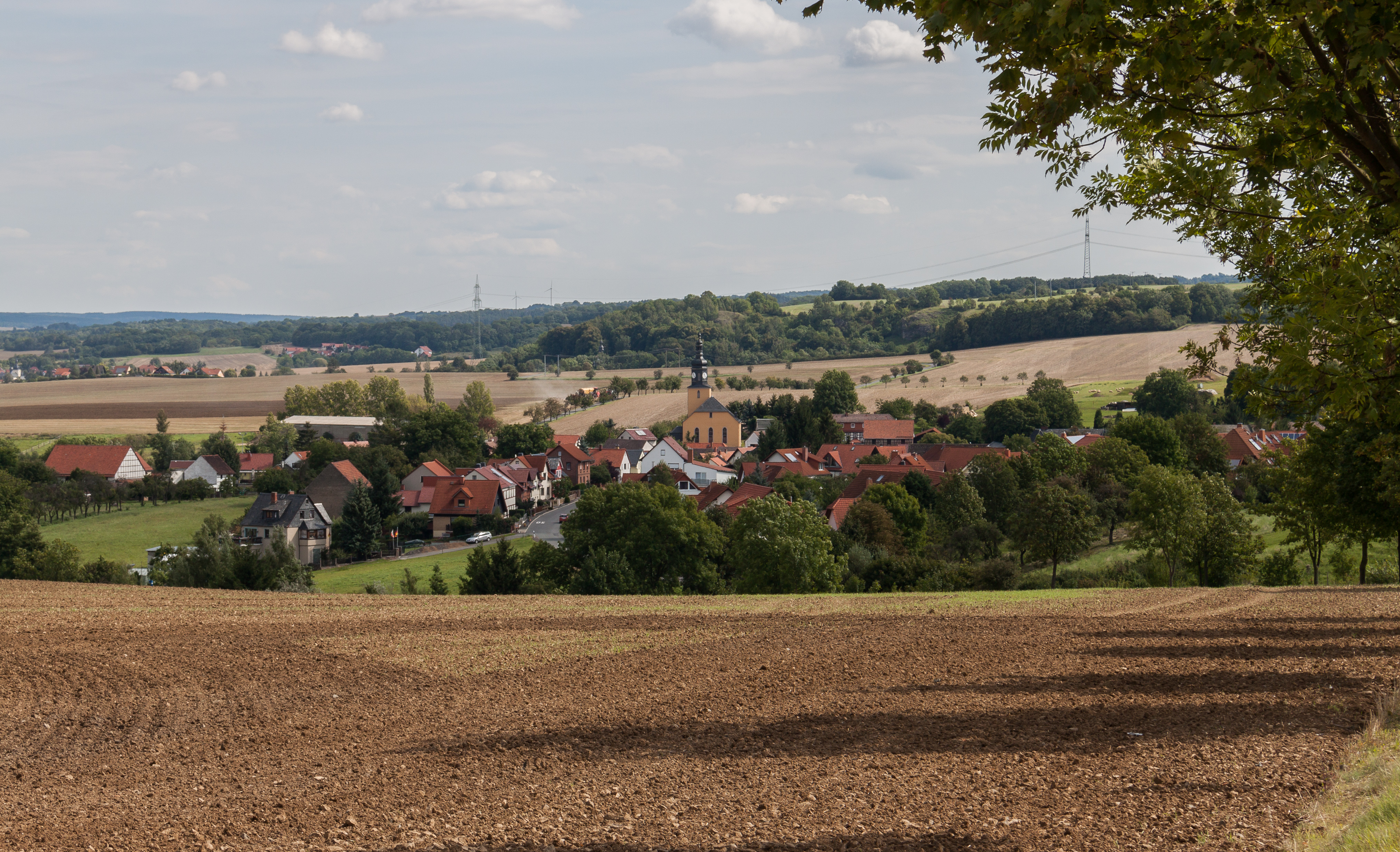

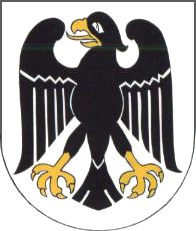
- Coat of arms

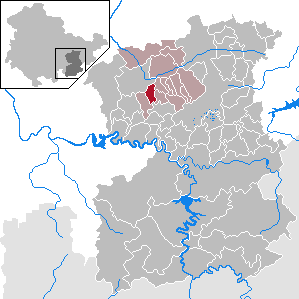
- Location of Bodelwitz within Saale-Orla-Kreis district
- Interactive map of Bodelwitz
- Location within Germany Location within Thuringia
- Coordinates: 50°41′10″N 11°37′23″E
- Country: Germany
- State: Thuringia
- District: Saale-Orla-Kreis
- Municipal assoc.: Oppurg

Government
  - Mayor (2022–28): Katja Staps (CDU)

Area
  - Total: 4.60 km^{2} (1.78 sq mi)
- Elevation: 280 m (920 ft)

Population (2025-12-31)
  - Total: 561
  - Density: 122/km^{2} (316/sq mi)
- Time zone: UTC+01:00 (CET)
  - Summer (DST): UTC+02:00 (CEST)
- Postal codes: 07381
- Dialling codes: 03647
- Vehicle registration: SOK
- Website: www.vg-oppurg.de

Bodelwitz is a municipality in the district Saale-Orla-Kreis, in Thuringia, Germany.
