= Lemnitz =

- Municipality
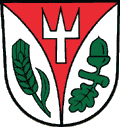
- Coat of arms

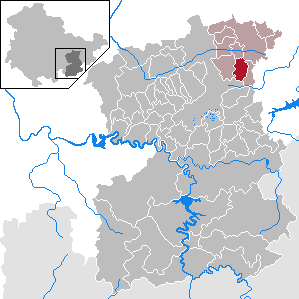
- Location of Lemnitz within Saale-Orla-Kreis district
- Interactive map of Lemnitz
- Location within Germany Location within Thuringia
- Coordinates: 50°42′57″N 11°50′44″E
- Country: Germany
- State: Thuringia
- District: Saale-Orla-Kreis
- Municipal assoc.: Triptis

Government
  - Mayor (2022–28): Martin Lämmer

Area
  - Total: 8.03 km^{2} (3.10 sq mi)
- Elevation: 400 m (1,300 ft)

Population (2025-12-31)
  - Total: 370
  - Density: 46/km^{2} (120/sq mi)
- Time zone: UTC+01:00 (CET)
  - Summer (DST): UTC+02:00 (CEST)
- Postal codes: 07819
- Dialling codes: 036482
- Vehicle registration: SOK
- Website: www.triptis.de

Lemnitz (German pronunciation: [ˈlɛmnɪts]) is a municipality in Saale-Orla-Kreis, Thuringia, Germany, on the edge of the Thuringian Forest. The town is a member of the municipal association Triptis.

== Notable people ==
- Albert Abicht (1893–1973) - politician
