= Volkmannsdorf =

- Municipality
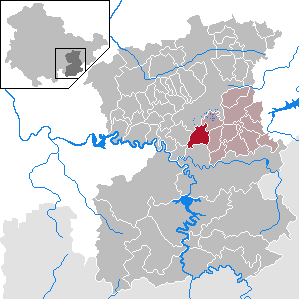
- Location of Volkmannsdorf within Saale-Orla-Kreis district
- Interactive map of Volkmannsdorf
- Location within Germany Location within Thuringia
- Coordinates: 50°36′42″N 11°44′1″E
- Country: Germany
- State: Thuringia
- District: Saale-Orla-Kreis
- Municipal assoc.: Seenplatte

Government
  - Mayor (2022–28): Joachim Kliche

Area
  - Total: 9.52 km^{2} (3.68 sq mi)
- Elevation: 440 m (1,440 ft)

Population (2025-12-31)
  - Total: 240
  - Density: 25/km^{2} (65/sq mi)
- Time zone: UTC+01:00 (CET)
  - Summer (DST): UTC+02:00 (CEST)
- Postal codes: 07924
- Dialling codes: 03663
- Vehicle registration: SOK
- Website: www.vg-seenplatte.de

Volkmannsdorf (German pronunciation: [ˈfɔlkmansdɔʁf]) is a municipality in the Saale-Orla-Kreis district of Thuringia, Germany.

== History ==
Volkmannsdorf belonged until 1918 to the Duchy of Saxe-Weimar.
