= Oettersdorf =

- Municipality
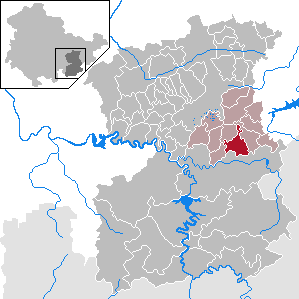
- Location of Oettersdorf within Saale-Orla-Kreis district
- Interactive map of Oettersdorf
- Location within Germany Location within Thuringia
- Coordinates: 50°36′N 11°49′E
- Country: Germany
- State: Thuringia
- District: Saale-Orla-Kreis
- Municipal assoc.: Seenplatte

Government
  - Mayor: Dirk Kühnel

Area
  - Total: 10.34 km^{2} (3.99 sq mi)
- Elevation: 470 m (1,540 ft)

Population (2025-12-31)
  - Total: 800
  - Density: 77/km^{2} (200/sq mi)
- Time zone: UTC+01:00 (CET)
  - Summer (DST): UTC+02:00 (CEST)
- Postal codes: 07907
- Dialling codes: 03663
- Vehicle registration: SOK
- Website: www.oettersdorf.de

Oettersdorf (German pronunciation: [ˈœtɐsdɔʁf]) is a municipality in the district Saale-Orla-Kreis, in Thuringia, Germany.
