= Weira =

- Municipality
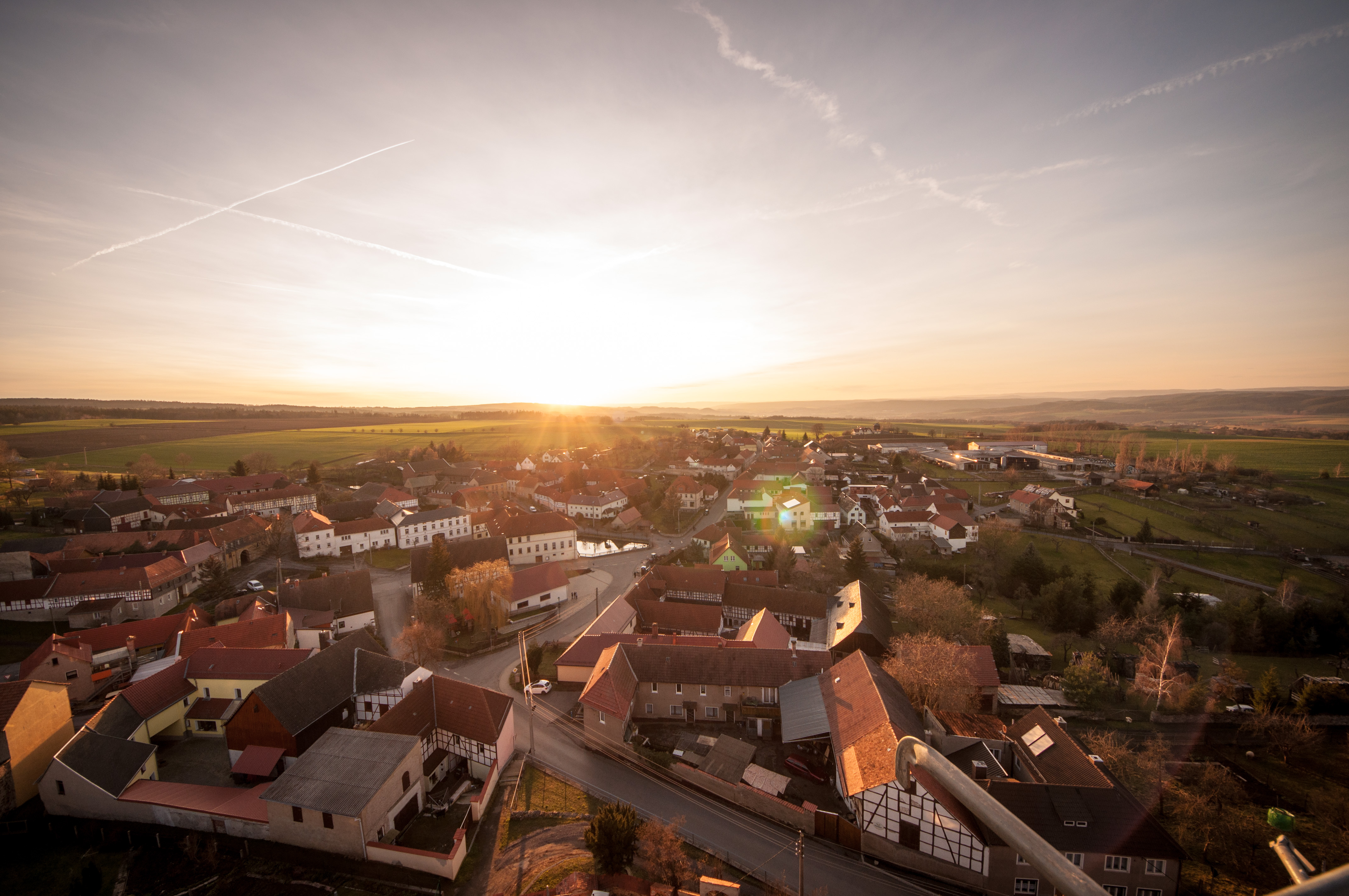

- Coat of arms

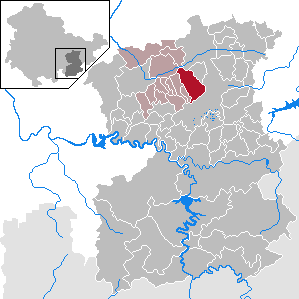
- Location of Weira within Saale-Orla-Kreis district
- Interactive map of Weira
- Location within Germany Location within Thuringia
- Coordinates: 50°42′N 11°43′E
- Country: Germany
- State: Thuringia
- District: Saale-Orla-Kreis
- Municipal assoc.: Oppurg

Government
  - Mayor (2022–28): Steffen Rogalla

Area
  - Total: 14.88 km^{2} (5.75 sq mi)
- Elevation: 390 m (1,280 ft)

Population (2025-12-31)
  - Total: 373
  - Density: 25.1/km^{2} (64.9/sq mi)
- Time zone: UTC+01:00 (CET)
  - Summer (DST): UTC+02:00 (CEST)
- Postal codes: 07806
- Dialling codes: 036481
- Vehicle registration: SOK

Weira (German pronunciation: [ˈvaɪʁa]) is a municipality in the district Saale-Orla-Kreis, in Thuringia, Germany.

Weira was the birthplace of Richard Müller the socialist and industrial unionist active in the German Revolution of 1918.
