= Schöndorf, Thuringia =

Schöndorf
- Municipality
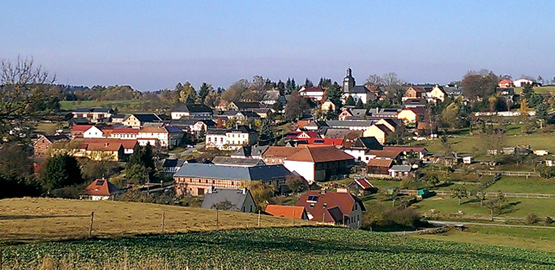

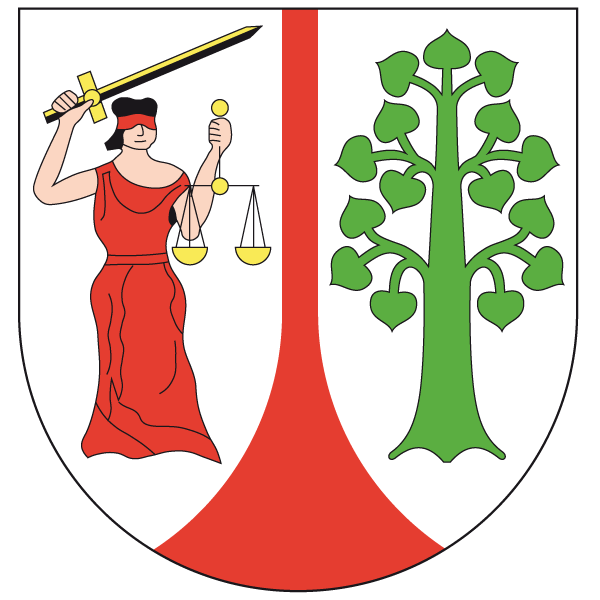
- Coat of arms

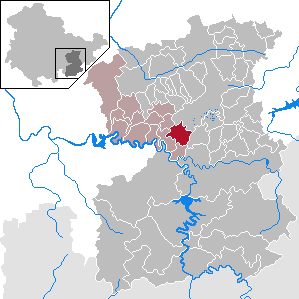
- Location of Schöndorf within Saale-Orla-Kreis district
- Interactive map of Schöndorf
- Location within Germany Location within Thuringia
- Coordinates: 50°37′N 11°42′E
- Country: Germany
- State: Thuringia
- District: Saale-Orla-Kreis
- Municipal assoc.: Ranis-Ziegenrück

Government
  - Mayor (2021–27): Jörg Meier

Area
  - Total: 10.1 km^{2} (3.9 sq mi)
- Elevation: 440 m (1,440 ft)

Population (2025-12-31)
  - Total: 263
  - Density: 26.0/km^{2} (67.4/sq mi)
- Time zone: UTC+01:00 (CET)
  - Summer (DST): UTC+02:00 (CEST)
- Postal codes: 07924
- Dialling codes: 036483
- Vehicle registration: SOK
- Website: www.vg-ranis-ziegenrueck.de

Schöndorf (German pronunciation: [ˈʃøːndɔʁf]) is a municipality in the district Saale-Orla-Kreis, in Thuringia, Germany.
