= Pörmitz =

- Municipality
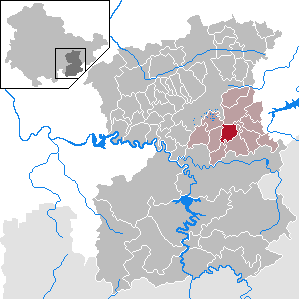
- Location of Pörmitz within Saale-Orla-Kreis district
- Interactive map of Pörmitz
- Location within Germany Location within Thuringia
- Coordinates: 50°36′49″N 11°48′25″E
- Country: Germany
- State: Thuringia
- District: Saale-Orla-Kreis
- Municipal assoc.: Seenplatte

Government
  - Mayor (2022–28): Frank Schäfer

Area
  - Total: 6.35 km^{2} (2.45 sq mi)
- Elevation: 452 m (1,483 ft)

Population (2025-12-31)
  - Total: 151
  - Density: 23.8/km^{2} (61.6/sq mi)
- Time zone: UTC+01:00 (CET)
  - Summer (DST): UTC+02:00 (CEST)
- Postal codes: 07907
- Dialling codes: 03663
- Vehicle registration: SOK
- Website: www.vg-seenplatte.de

Pörmitz is a municipality in the district Saale-Orla-Kreis, in Thuringia, Germany.
