= Triptis =

- Town
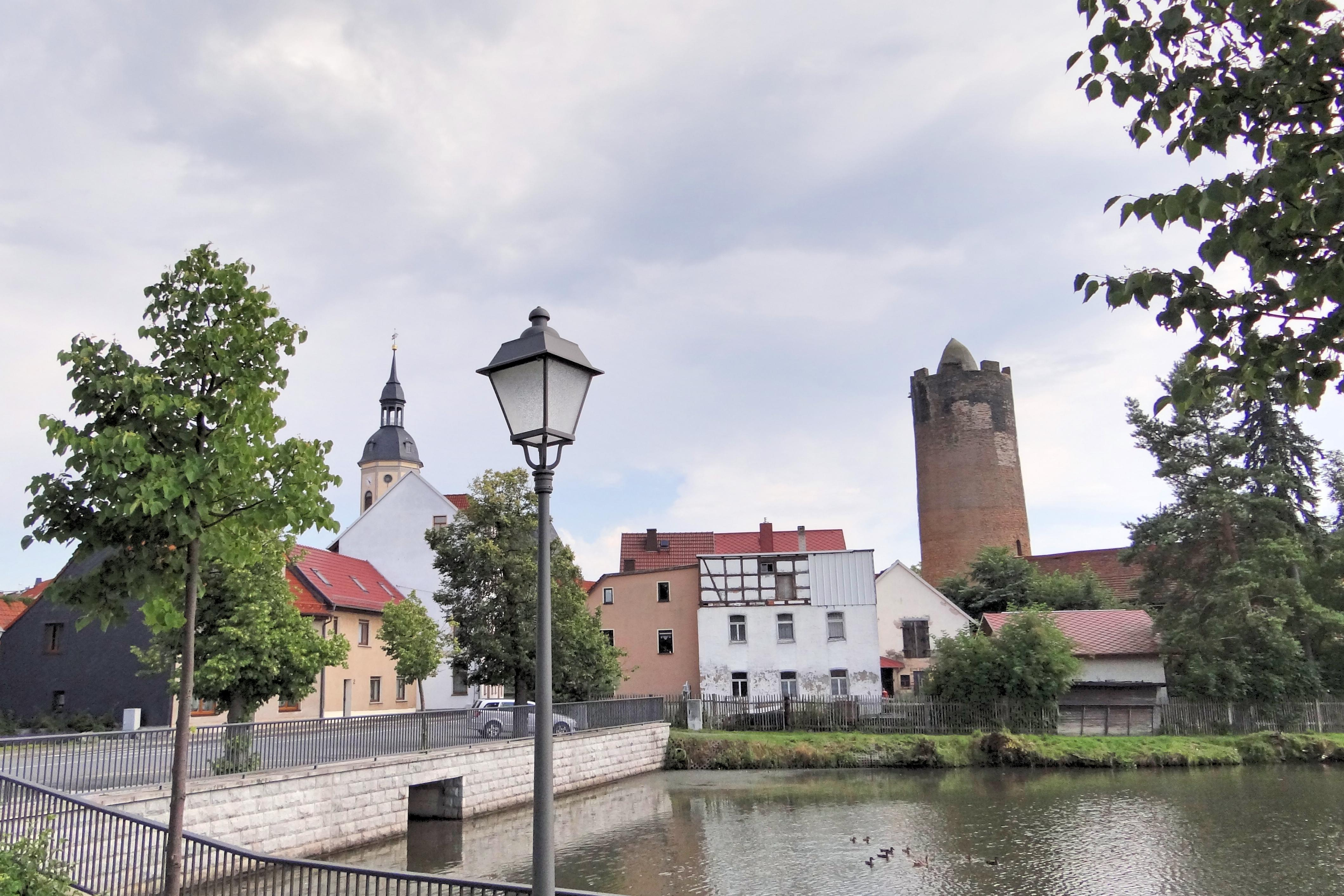
- Town center of Triptis

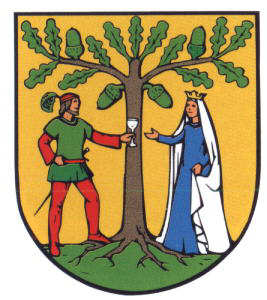
- Coat of arms

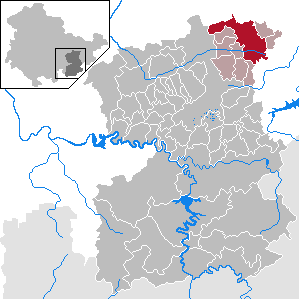
- Location of Triptis within Saale-Orla-Kreis district
- Interactive map of Triptis
- Location within Germany Location within Thuringia
- Coordinates: 50°44′N 11°51′E
- Country: Germany
- State: Thuringia
- District: Saale-Orla-Kreis
- Municipal assoc.: Triptis
- Subdivisions: 8

Government
  - Mayor (2024–30): Jan Wißgott

Area
  - Total: 33.15 km^{2} (12.80 sq mi)
- Elevation: 358 m (1,175 ft)

Population (2025-12-31)
  - Total: 3,606
  - Density: 108.8/km^{2} (281.7/sq mi)
- Time zone: UTC+01:00 (CET)
  - Summer (DST): UTC+02:00 (CEST)
- Postal codes: 07819
- Dialling codes: 036482
- Vehicle registration: SOK
- Website: www.triptis.de

Triptis (German pronunciation: [ˈtʁɪptɪs]) is a town in the Saale-Orla-Kreis district, in Thuringia, Germany. It is situated 22 km southwest of Gera. The town is the seat of the municipal association Triptis.

== History ==
Within the German Empire (1871–1918), Triptis was part of the Grand Duchy of Saxe-Weimar-Eisenach. In East Germany, it was part of Bezirk Gera.
