= Saale-Orla-Kreis =

Coordinates: 50°35′N 11°45′E

Saale-Orla
- District
- Flag Coat of arms
- Country: Germany
- State: Thuringia
- Capital: Schleiz

Government
  - District admin.: Christian Herrgott (CDU)

Area
  - Total: 1,151.3 km^{2} (444.5 sq mi)

Population (31 December 2024)
  - Total: 77,341
  - Density: 67.177/km^{2} (173.99/sq mi)
- Time zone: UTC+01:00 (CET)
  - Summer (DST): UTC+02:00 (CEST)
- Vehicle registration: SOK, LBS, PN, SCZ
- Website: www.saale-orla-kreis.de

Saale-Orla is a Kreis (district) in the east of Thuringia, Germany. Neighboring districts are (from the north clockwise) the districts Saale-Holzland, Greiz, the Vogtlandkreis in Saxony, the Bavarian districts Hof and Kronach, and the district Saalfeld-Rudolstadt.

== History ==
The district was created in 1994 by merging the previous districts Lobenstein, Pößneck and Schleiz.

== Geography ==
The main rivers in the district are the Saale and the Orla, which also contributed to the name of the district. The highest elevation with 732.9 m above sea level is the Sieglitzberg (near Lobenstein), the lowest with 180 m is near Schimmersburg Langenorla. The district is mountainous, covering the Thüringer Schiefergebirge. The dams of the Saale create the biggest system of artificial lakes in Germany.

== Coat of arms ==
The two lions in the top of the coat of arms represent the historic states which covered the area in the past. In the left is the lion with crown of the Reuß family, while the lion to the right is the symbol of the margravate of Meißen. The two wavy lines at the bottom symbolize the two rivers of the district, Saale and Orla.

== Towns and municipalities ==
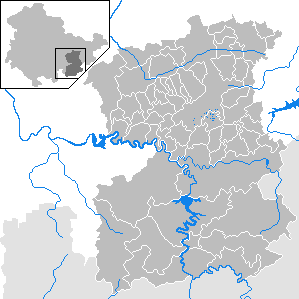
Clickable map of towns and municipalities in the district

Verwaltungsgemeinschaft-free towns
1. Bad Lobenstein
2. Gefell
3. Hirschberg
4. Neustadt an der Orla
5. Pößneck
6. Saalburg-Ebersdorf
7. Schleiz
8. Tanna
9. Wurzbach
and municipalities
1. Kospoda
2. Remptendorf
3. Rosenthal am Rennsteig

Verwaltungsgemeinschaften
| 1. Oppurg; 1. Bodelwitz; 2. Döbritz; 3. Gertewitz; 4. Grobengereuth; 5. Langenorla; 6. Lausnitz; 7. Nimritz; 8. Oberoppurg; 9. Oppurg^{1}; 10. Quaschwitz; 11. Solkwitz; 12. Weira; 13. Wernburg | 2. Ranis-Ziegenrück; 1. Eßbach; 2. Gössitz; 3. Keila; 4. Krölpa; 5. Moxa; 6. Paska; 7. Peuschen; 8. Ranis^{1, 2}; 9. Schmorda; 10. Schöndorf; 11. Seisla; 12. Wilhelmsdorf; 13. Ziegenrück^{2} | 3. Seenplatte; 1. Dittersdorf; 2. Görkwitz; 3. Göschitz; 4. Kirschkau; 5. Löhma; 6. Moßbach; 7. Neundorf bei Schleiz; 8. Oettersdorf^{1}; 9. Plothen; 10. Pörmitz; 11. Tegau; 12. Volkmannsdorf | 4. Triptis; 1. Dreitzsch; 2. Geroda; 3. Lemnitz; 4. Miesitz; 5. Mittelpöllnitz; 6. Rosendorf; 7. Schmieritz; 8. Tömmelsdorf; 9. Triptis^{1, 2} |
^{1}seat of the Verwaltungsgemeinschaft;^{2}town
