= List of Fu Jen Catholic University alumni =

This page lists notable alumni and students of Fu Jen Catholic University.

== Nobel laureates ==
- Wei-min Hao, climate scientist and contributor to the Intergovernmental Panel on Climate Change; shared the 2007 Nobel Peace Prize

== Politics ==
=== Premier ===
- Lin Chuan, the 48th Taiwanese Premier
- Yeh Chu-lan, the 28th Taiwanese Vice Premier (2004–2005)
- Shih Jun-ji, the 36th Taiwanese Vice Premier (2017–2019), professor at National Taiwan University

=== Ministers ===
- Andrew Hsia, Minister of Mainland Affairs Council (2015–2016)
- Andrew Yang, Minister of National Defense (2013)
- Chang Chang-pang, Deputy Secretary-General of Executive Yuan
- Chiang Been-huang, served as the Minister of Health and Welfare, 2014–2016
- Ho Pei-shan, Deputy Secretary-General of Executive Yuan
- Sun Ta-chuan, Vice President of Control Yuan
- Wang Guangmei, First Lady of the People's Republic of China (1959–1968)
- Wang Ju-hsuan, Minister of Council of Labor Affairs (2008–2012)

=== International ===
- Jim Brown, high-level language interpreter of U.S. State Department
- Jhy-Wey Shieh, diplomatic representative of Taiwan in the Federal Republic of Germany
- Heishiro Ogawa, first Japanese Ambassador to the People's Republic of China

=== Congressmen and officers ===
- Chiang Huei-Chen, legislator for Kuomintang
- Chin Huei-chu, legislator for Kuomintang
- Huang Sue-ying, legislator for Democratic Progressive Party
- Kao Jyh-peng, legislator for Democratic Progressive Party
- Kao Yang-sheng, legislator for Kuomintang
- Lee Kun-tse, legislator for Democratic Progressive Party
- Liao Pen-yen, legislator and member of New Taipei City Council
- Lin Chih-chia, legislator for Taiwan Solidarity Union
- Lin Tai-hua, legislator for Democratic Progressive Party
- Liou Tzong-Der Commissioner of National Communications Commission
- Pasuya Yao, legislator for Democratic Progressive Party
- Tang Huo-shen, legislator for Democratic Progressive Party
- Tang Jinn-chuan, legislator for Democratic Progressive Party
- Tsai Sheng-pang, legislator for Kuomintang
- Walis Perin, Seediq Taiwanese politician, served four terms in the Legislative Yuan and member of Control Yuan
- Wang Shu-hui, former legislator for Democratic Progressive Party
- Wu Cherng-dean, legislator for People First Party
- Yang Ying-hsiung, legislator for Kuomintang
- Yang Yu-hsin, legislator for Kuomintang
- Yao Li-ming, legislator, former professor at National Sun Yat-sen University

=== Other politicians ===
- Cheng Nan-jung, Taiwanese publisher and pro-democracy activist who self-immolated in support of Taiwan Independence
- Chou Hsi-wei, Magistrate of Taipei County (2005–2010)
- Hou Chong-wen, Deputy Mayor of Chiayi City
- Huang Ching-yin, politician and former deputy spokesperson for the Taipei City Government
- Liu Shou-cheng, Magistrate of Yilan County (1997–2005)
- Lu Kuo-hua, Magistrate of Yilan County (2005–2009)
- Su Huan-chih, Magistrate of Tainan County (2001–2010)
- Sean Lien, former Chairman of the Taipei Smart Card Corporation

== Academic ==
=== American scholars ===
- Lee-Jen Wei, professor at Harvard University
- Chi-ming Hou, fellow at Harvard University, professor at Colgate University and Brookings Institution
- James L.Y. Liu, professor at Stanford University, University of London, University of Hong Kong
- Francis L. K. Hsu, faculty of Columbia University, Cornell University, Northwestern University, 62nd President of the American Anthropological Association
- Esther H. Chang, professor at Georgetown University Lombardi Cancer Center
- Sung-lan Hsia, professor at Miami University
- Kuo-chu Ho, physicist at the University of Chicago, professor at University of Florida and Nankai University

=== Academicians ===
- Lee C. Teng, academician of the Academia Sinica
- Xing Qiyi, academician of the Chinese Academy of Sciences
- Li Dongying, academician of the Chinese Academy of Engineering
- Francis L. K. Hsu, academician of the Academia Sinica

=== University presidents and others ===
- Liu Da, President of Tsinghua University and the University of Science and Technology of China
- Bernard Li, President of Fu Jen Catholic University
- Hou Chong-wen, President of National Taipei University
- Chou Kung-shin, archaeologist, served as Director of National Palace Museum
- Alice Chien Chang, molecular biologist and neuroscientist.

== Theology ==
- Joche Albert Ly, Chinese Marist Brother
- James Lin Xili, first underground Roman Catholic bishop of the Diocese of Wenzhou (1992–2009)
- Benedict Bonaventura Zhang Xin, bishop of the Roman Catholic Archdiocese of Taiyuan, 1981–1994

== Business ==
- Steve Chang, co-founder and former CEO of Trend Micro
- Thomas Wu, founder and chairman of Taishin Holdings and Taishin International Bank

== Literature and journalism ==
- Hsiao-Hung Pai, UK-based journalist and author
- Chang Ta-chun, fiction writer
- Yang-Min Lin, Taiwanese author and poet
- Wu Mingyi, writer, 2018 Man Booker International Prize nominee
- Zhang Dachun, writer

== Theatre and film/visual art and illustration ==
- Stan Lai, stage play director
- Terry Hu, film actress, writer and translator
- Wu Nien-jen, screenwriter and film director
- Reen Yu, actress and commercial model
- Alfonso Wong, creator of Old Master Q comic strip
- Nicky Wu, Taiwanese actor, singer and entrepreneur
- Vivian Sung, Taiwanese actress

== Classical music ==
- Lo Kii-Ming, Taiwanese musicologist and professor of musicology at National Taiwan Normal University
- Wu Ting-yu, Taiwanese violinist, currently concertmaster of Taiwan's National Symphony Orchestra

== Entertainment ==
- Jolin Tsai, Mandopop singer
- MC HotDog, Taiwan's original rapper
- Hsueh Shih-ling, actor and member of hip-hop band Da Mouth
- An Jun Can, member of boy band Comic Boyz
- Cherry Boom, all members
- Faye Zhan, F.I.R. member
- Vicky Chen, singer

== Sport ==
- Chen Chih-yuan, former Taiwanese baseball player
- Pan Wei-lun, Taiwanese professional baseball pitcher
- Wu Pai-ho, Taiwanese football player
- Lee Fu-an, Taiwanese decathlete
- Cheng Chao-tsun, Taiwanese track and field athlete who competes in the javelin throw
- Kuo Hsing-chun, Taiwanese weightlifter, Olympian
- Huang Yi-ting, Taiwanese competitive rower
- Lin Yun-ju, one of youngest table tennis players from Taiwan
