= 607th Tank Destroyer Battalion =

- Active: 15 December 1941 – 27 October 1945
- Country: United States
- Allegiance: Federal
- Branch: Regular Army
- Size: Battalion
- Part of: Independent unit
- Equipment: 3-inch Gun M5; M36 tank destroyer

The 607th Tank Destroyer Battalion was a tank destroyer battalion of the United States Army active during the Second World War. They arrived in England during April, 1944, and entered combat in mid June, landing at Utah Beach. The unit fought across France and into Germany during the summer and early winter of 1944. In late winter, they were then pulled out and sent to Belgium near the end of the Ardennes Campaign and again fought their way into and across Germany, ending the war near the Czechoslovak border. The 607th received credit for the Normandy, Northern France, Rhineland, Ardennes-Alsace and Central Europe campaigns.

== History ==
=== Early service ===
The battalion was activated on 15 December 1941 with personnel from the 7th Infantry Division Provisional Antitank Battalion. Additional personnel from Washington, Oregon, Idaho and Montana were assigned in March, 1942. In December, 1942 and January, 1943, personnel from Indiana, Ohio, Kentucky and West Virginia replaced the losses of the preceding nine months. On 15 December 1943, it was reorganized, changing from a self-propelled to a towed battalion equipped with the 3in Gun M5 and the Reconnaissance Company being inactivated. Except for four and a half months training at the Tank Destroyer Center, at Camp Hood, Texas, the battalion received all of its precombat training in California at Sunnyvale, Hunter Liggett Military Reservation, Camp San Luis Obispo, Lost Hills, Desert Training Center and Camp Cooke. The unit deployed to the United Kingdom on 13 April 1944, sailing on the USS Wakefield (AP-21) and arriving on the 21st. The unit was stationed in Macclesfield, Cheshire, England for one month and then proceeded to Camp Barton Stacey, in southern England, where it made final preparations for the invasion, arriving on the beaches of Normandy, France on 17 June 1944.

=== Normandy ===
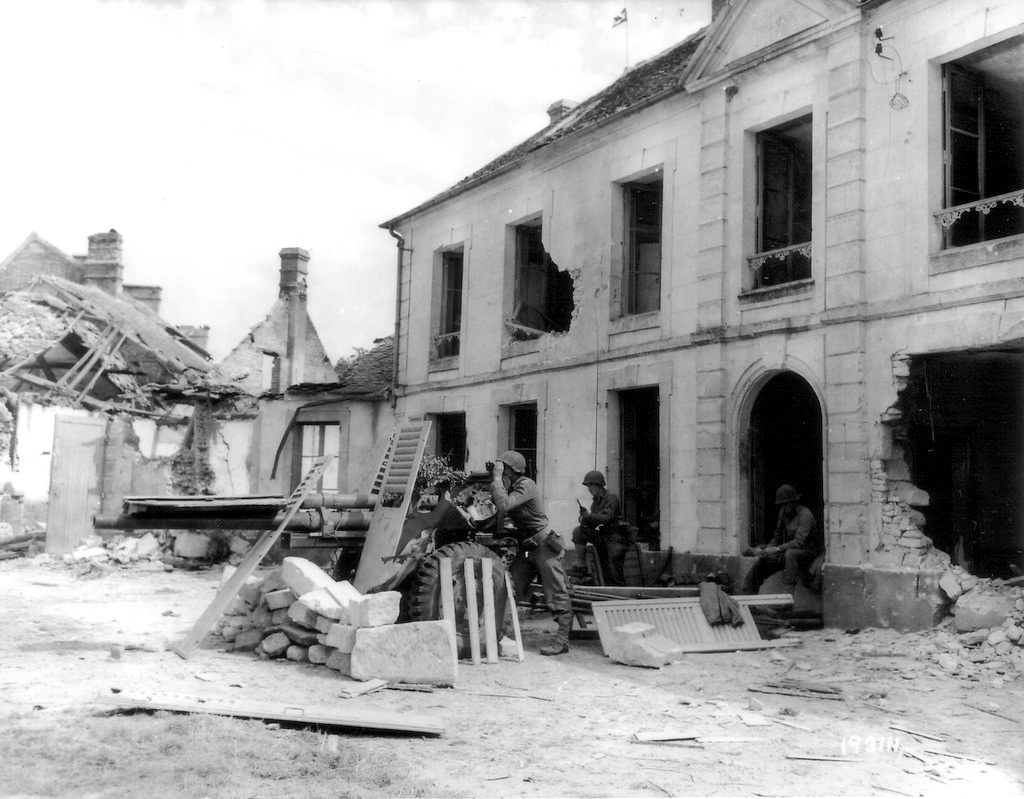
A towed M5 3" anti-tank gun of the 607th Tank Destroyer Battalion somewhere in France, 1944

Two companies (Headquarters and A) landed in Normandy at 0130 on 17 June (D+11) at Utah Beach, with Companies B and C being unable to land due to rough water. Company A was committed to action in the Battle of Cherbourg on arrival, attached to the 9th Infantry Division. During this mission, Co A captured its, and the battalions, first prisoner. The battalion was relieved from attachment to the VII Corps and attached to VIII Corps on 19 June, with Company A attached to the 82nd Airborne Division until 4 July and the battalion, less Co A, to the 90th Infantry Division. The remaining two companies (B and C) landed on 23 June, with Co B joining the 357th Infantry Regiment of the 90th ID. Company C moved to the TD's secondary mission, indirect fire, in the vicinity of Cretteville and fired the first rounds from a 3" gun of the battalion on French soil. During the period of 7 to 27 July, the division advanced very slowly, especially in the areas around Foret De Monte Castro on Hill 122, on the approaches to Seves Island and at Beau Coudray. Following the bombing from St. Lo to the southwest toward Periers and the exploitation of the forced breakthrough, the enemy withdrew from the division front on the night of 27 July. During the month of July, 15,424 rounds were fired indirect. A breakthrough to the enemy's rear had been made.

Task Force Weaver, consisting of the 357th Infantry Regiment, 712th Tank Battalion, 344th and 345th Field Artillery Battalions and Co. A of the 607th, was organized and given the mission of securing the crossing of the Mayenne River, at Mayenne, and then proceed to Le Mans. On 5 August, the task force left La Condonniere, moving towards Mayenne and meeting light resistance. On the 6th the drive continued towards Le Mans, during which Co C destroyed an enemy half track, the first armored vehicle hit by the battalion. The task force arrived in Le Mans on the 8th.

On 11 August, units of the battalion began moving north with the 90th as the division sought to close in on the southern side of the pincer which closed the Falaise pocket. The battalion continued to support the infantry regiments, and helped repel several armored and infantry attacks in the areas around Le Bourg-Saint-Leonard, Chambois and St. Eugenie; between 16 and 21 August, they accounted for thirty-four tanks, twenty-three self-propelled guns, nine halftracks and sixteen artillery pieces destroyed or captured, with over five hundred prisoners taken and fifteen men awarded Silver Stars.

=== Push through France ===
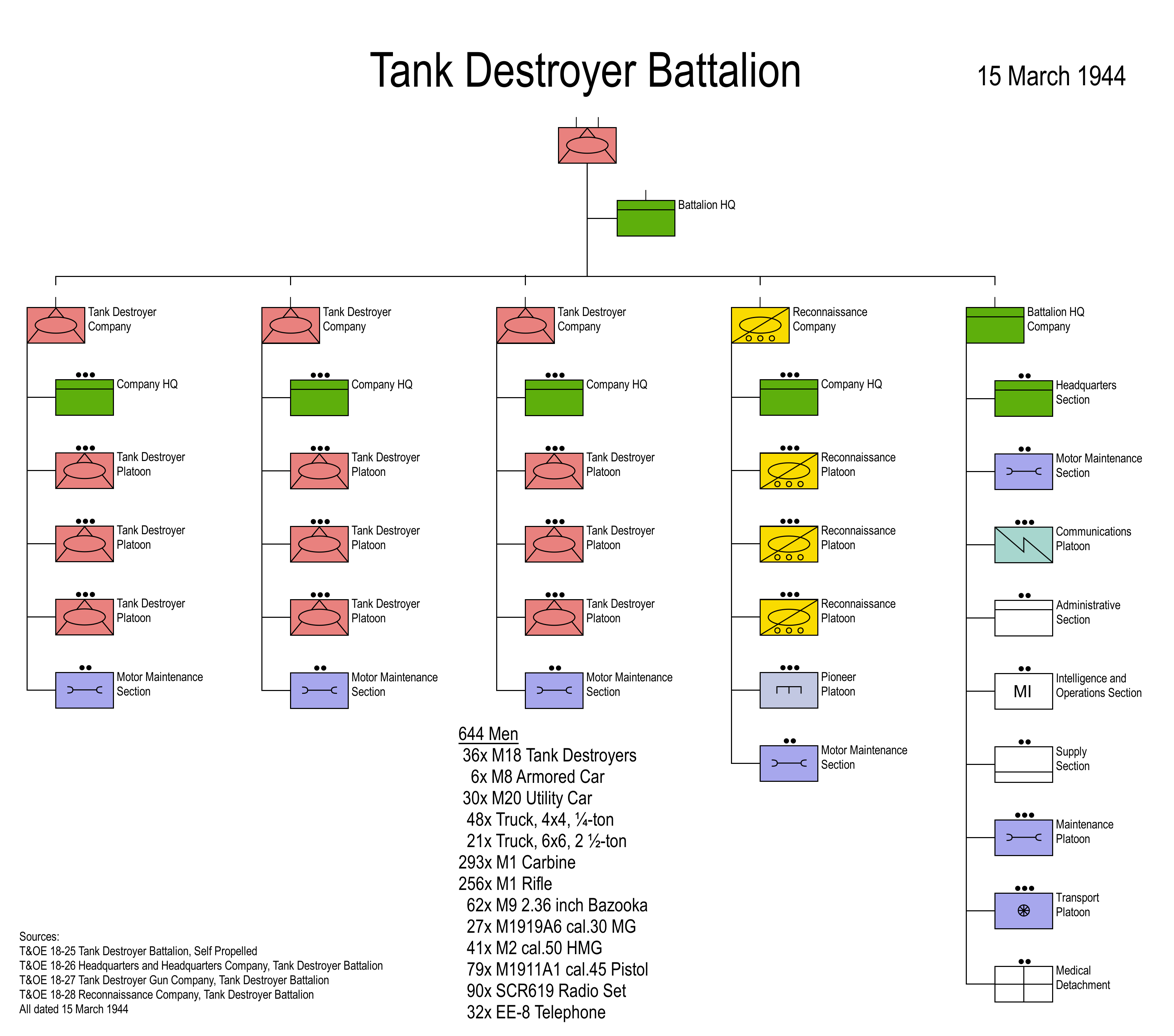
Tank Destroyer Battalion (SP) Structure - March 1944

While the 607th was fighting in the Falaise pocket, other units had pushed far to the east and southeast. With the 90th, the battalion marched to Fontainbleau, a distance of 171 miles on 26 August. Between 27 August and 1 September, the various companies in support of the 357th and 359th IR's moved north of Reims and to Ft. de Brimont, a distance of 135 miles from Fontainbleau. Little opposition was met on this drive. On 8 Sept., the unit participated in fending off a counterattack by the German Panzer Brigade 106 which was attacking in the Mairy/Trieux/Briey area (Battle of Mairy). The attack commenced in the pre-dawn hours but the 607th's first contact with the Germans was at 0700hrs when enemy tanks began firing at Mairy. The 3" guns knocked out two tanks. Around 0800 the Germans attempted to outflank the anti-tank defenses by coming into the town from the south aboard 11 armored half-tracks. Two were knocked out by bazooka fire from the TD platoon and, as they attempted to exit the town to the north, four more were lost to the 3" guns. The actions against Pz. Brig. 106 by the 607th and units of the 90th ID essentially destroyed one of the four panzer brigades committed to the Lorraine counteroffensive by the Germans.

By 13 September, the battalion, continuing to support the infantry regiments, had closed up to the Moselle River near Thionville. On this date, a gun from the 2nd platoon, C Company, located 200 yards west of Basse Parth, fired ten rounds into Germany, targeting the church steeple in Perl. These were the first rounds fired by the 90th into Germany, first rounds fired by the XX Corps into Germany and it is believed to have been the first fire to fall into Germany from the Third Army. During the remainder of Sept. and through Oct., the battalion continued to support the infantry regiments as they closed on Metz, France. The 95th Infantry Division began to relieve the 90th on 1 Nov. and effective 2 Nov., the 607th was attached to the 95th ID. Attacks toward Metz continued. The first main effort began with the crossing of the Moselle River south of Uckange by the 1st Bn of the 377th IR, the 2nd Bn pushing south from Maizieres-les-Metz and the advance to the southeast and east by the 378th and 379th Infantry Regiments. That same day, bazooka teams of the 607th crossed the Moselle to support the 1st Bn of the 377th. During the week of 12–19 Nov., the battalion re-equipped with the self-propelled M36 tank destroyer, armed with a 90mm gun, and returned to combat just in time for the final attack on the city. Lt. Col. Harald S. Sundt, battalion commander, received the Oak Leaf Cluster to the Silver Star for his success in directing the Battalion in artillery and anti-tank support of the 95th Division from 8 to 20 November during the attack on Metz. The 95th, including the 607th and other attached units, received a commendation letter from General George S. Patton for their part in the battle at Metz. On 23 November, the battalion moved along the Moselle River to the vicinity of Ars-Laquenexy (six miles southeast of Metz).

=== The Saar Battles and Moving to the Defensive ===
As the 95th ID pushed to the northeast, the Germans fought a delaying action back through the Maginot Line toward the Saar River and the Siegfried Line which bordered on the east side of the Saar River. On 28 November, the 1st platoon of Co. C was defending the town of Falck, waiting for the arrival of the infantry, when a barrage of artillery was laid down followed by a German ground attack. Time after time the enemy attempted to take the town but were beaten off at each attempt. Platoon commander, 1st Lt. George King was awarded the Silver Star for his leadership during the defense of the town. For the remainder of the month, the companies, supporting the infantry regiments, moved on a seven-mile front to within three miles of the Saar River near Saarlautern.

As December began, the battalion continued to close on the Saar and Saarlautern. As the 95th arrived in the outskirts of Saarlautern, two of the three bridges across the Saar were blown with the one in the center of town still being intact. The 379th IR secured the bridge during the night of 2 December, and on the 3rd, the destroyers of 1st platoon of Co. B moved across the bridge to assist with securing the bridgehead. The platoon helped the infantry repulse an enemy infantry/tank counterattack, knocking out four tanks while losing one M-36. Two members of the 607th were awarded Distinguished Service Cross's, Cpl Eugene L. LaFountain (WIA) and 1st Lt. Richard A. Reynolds (KIA), for their actions in the bridgehead area. Attacks continued into Saarlautern-Roden and Fraulautern. With the enemy's thrust into the Ardennes, offensive action in the bridgehead slowed and units took up a defensive posture, preparing to counter any potential massed German attacks.

Reconnaissance of defensive positions began in earnest throughout the division sector. Routes and terrain were reconnoitered and observation posts established. The 607th recon platoons continued to maintain contact with units of the 106th Cavalry Group on the division's right flank. In Saarlautern, actions against the Siegfried Line continued. Co. B was attached to the 94th Infantry Division on 14 January 1945, assisting in the capture of and then providing AT defense for Tettingen. On the 18th, the enemy attacked and Co. B destroyed five tanks. Co. A relieved Co. B with the 94th ID and on the 24th, they destroyed five enemy tanks. Cos. A and B of the 607th were relieved by the 704th Tank Destroyer Battalion while Co. C continued to support the 95th ID in Saarlautern.

=== Against the Siegfried Line ===
On 27 January, the 95th was relieved by the 26th Infantry Division and was ordered to assemble in Belgium north of Bastogne. The battalion, on the coldest day of the winter, marched 150 miles to the vicinity of Houffalize. On 2 February, they were relieved from attachment to the 95th ID and attached to the 87th Infantry Division, which was closing on the enemy as they withdrew from the Ardennes bulge. For the third time, they were facing the Siegfried Line. Complicated by mud, which made cross country movement impossible, the attack began. Units advanced against numerous pill boxes, neutralizing them and moving to the next. By early March, the key towns of Olzheim, Neuendorf and Ormont were taken and the Siegfried Line was breached.

The 87th continued to advance eastward; mines, blown bridges and artillery frequently holding up movement. The Kyll River was crossed and by 9 March, the area to the Ahr River had been cleared. During the next five days, all 607th units remained in place and conducted maintenance. On 14 March, the Division was ordered to march to a position facing Koblenz. The next mission was to take this town. During the night of 16 March, Co. A supported the 347th Infantry Regiment's crossing of the Moselle River and subsequent advance southeast toward the Rhine River. On 18 March, Co. C crossed the Moselle and accompanied the 345th Infantry Regiment into Koblenz. Later that day they fired at Fort Konstantin. Within the next two days Koblenz was captured. Direct fire caused 14 officers and 85 men to surrender the fort, one of the last positions taken.

=== The Rhine Battles ===
The battalion assembled near Nortershausen, 10 miles southwest of Koblenz. The 347th IR crossed the Rhine in boats against heavy 20mm fire on the 25th, with support provided by Co. A firing at targets near Ober-Lahnstein. Co. C supported the 345th IR's crossing at Boppard, Germany. Later that day, Co. C and one platoon of Co. A were ferried across at Boppard and moved to support the expansion of the bridgehead. Two tanks of Co. B, 735th Tank Battalion and two tank destroyers of the 2nd platoon, Co. C, were the first armor with the 87th ID to cross the Rhine River.

Following the crossing, German resistance decreased and it was necessary to form a fast moving armored unit to reach into the German rear areas to disrupt communications and cut up administrative units and installations. Task Force Sundt was formed, composed of the 607th, less A and C companies, Co. A of the 735th Tank Battalion, the 87th Rcn. Troop, K Co. of the 346th IR, 2nd platoon Co. C of the 312th Eng. Bn and supporting fires from the 335th Field Artillery Battalion. The task force was divided into three companies plus a CP group. The unit assembled at Dachsenhausen, which was the limit of the divisions advance.

On 27 March at 0545, the Task Force moved toward Ruppertshofen, reaching the town by 0830 where it regrouped. By 1300, Nastatten had been secured and the TF was across the Muhl River. Over the next four days, units of the TF overcame resistance varying from light to heavy, blown bridges and road blocks, all the while collecting hundreds of prisoners, to take numerous small towns and on the 31st the entire TF was continuing to clear the woods west of Butzbach. On 1 April, the Task Force was disbanded, having taken 1485 prisoners and advancing 76 miles. Companies A and C, with combat teams from the 87th ID, had continued to advance along the flanks of the Task Force. Armored thrusts had moved well to the east of the Division's advance leaving it in the rear areas.

On 3 April, Co. A was attached to the 6th Cavalry Group and joined them at Huhlbach. On the 4th, the battalion with Companies B and C moved to assembly areas in the vicinity of Ronshausen with the 345th and 346th IR's. Company A was relieved from attachment to the 6th Cav. Group and rejoined the battalion. The following day the 87th went back on the offensive. All three companies moved to the vicinity of Oberschonau with the infantry regiments. Task Force Sundt was reconstituted at Tambach on the 10th and again divided into three companies. With clearance from the 89th Infantry Division to move through their area to the north, the TF proceeded northwest through Ohrdruf and Arnstadt. They then turned south back into the 87th's sector, cutting behind the enemy lines. The first opposition, heavy direct and artillery fire, was met at Trassdorf, SE of Arnstadt. Before Trassdorf could be taken, new orders were received directing the TF to head east through Stadtilm to Rudolstadt. Meanwhile, Co. A with the 347th IR was advancing in the southern part of the Division's zone, eventually meeting determined resistance at Cottendorf. After a TD was hit and set afire, Sgt. Dominic Karr evacuated a wounded man under small arms and artillery fire. Lt. Grant W. Claymore rescued two more men from the burning TD, earning a Distinguished Service Cross for his heroism. By evening, the TF and the three IR's held a line generally from just outside Stadtilm southwest to Angstedt, a distance of seven miles.

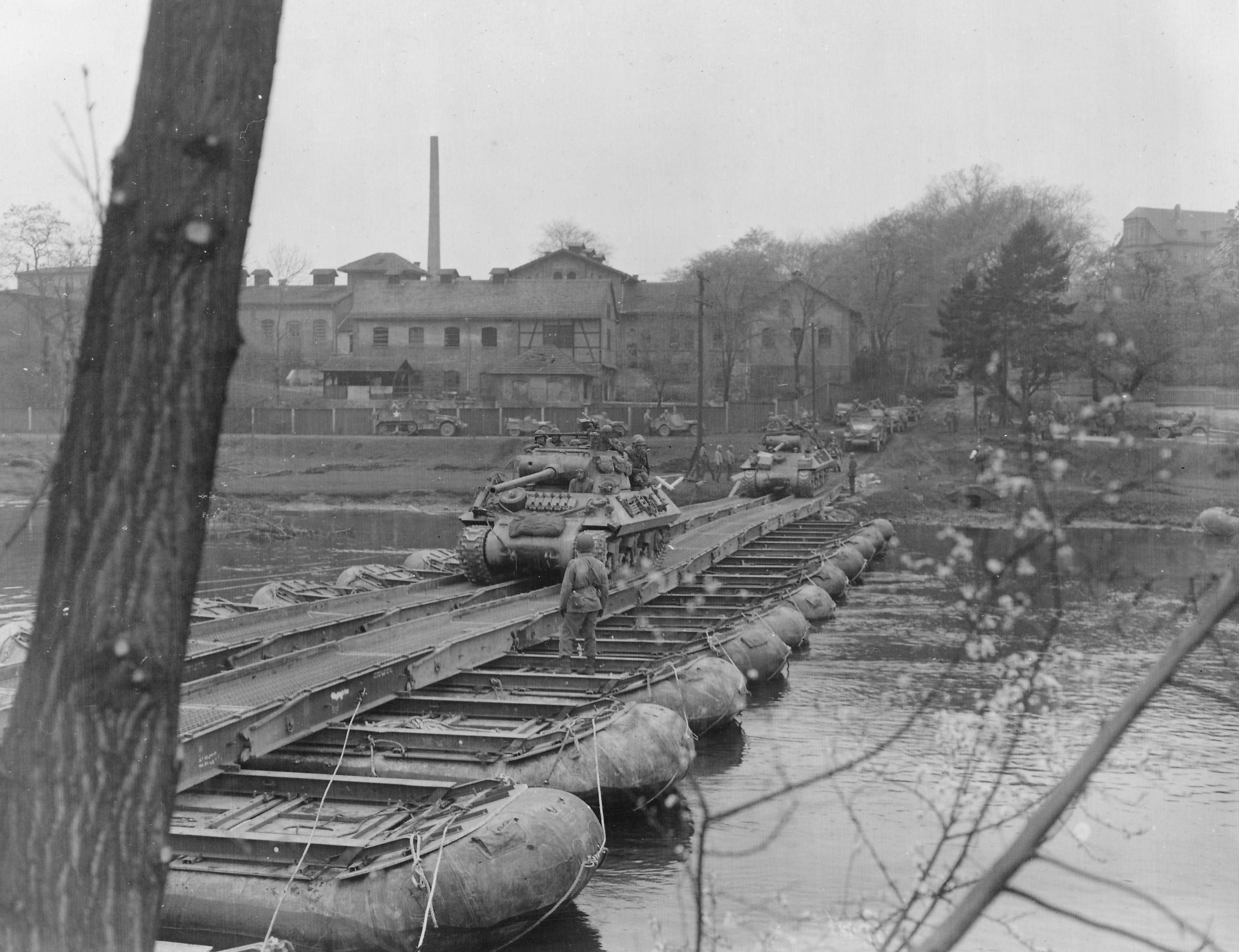
The 607th TD Bn crossing the Saale River at Saalfeld, Germany, April, 1945

An attack on Stadtilm was initiated on 12 April by the 1st and 2nd companies of the task force along with units of the 346th IR. The speed of the attack resulted in a bridge across the Ilm River being captured and the town was taken. The two companies continued moving east towards Rudolstadt, where they began meeting resistance, but by nightfall the southwest part of town had been taken. The next day, with the assistance of the 346th IR, the attack continued with the goal of capturing an intact bridge across the Saale River but this was not to be. All bridges had been blown so they raced towards Saalfeld, again finding the same conditions. A bridgehead was established and on the 14th the task force crossed the newly erected treadway bridge and headed east towards Peuschen, meeting resistance a few miles west of the town. After losing an M-8 and crew to bazooka fire, the town was taken and the task force bivouacked for the night in Wernburg. Meanwhile, 607th Companies A and C continued to advance with the infantry regiments behind the task force companies, with Co. A moving through Schmorda to Moxa and Co. C crossing the bridge at Weissen, then advancing a few miles before darkness.

The next day the task force continued to move eastward, passing through numerous small towns against light resistance. With the 2nd company in the lead, they intercepted a sizeable enemy force moving from Langenbuch on foot and in wagons. Joined by 1st Company, all the enemy were killed, captured or dispersed. The two companies moved east to Thierbach where heavy resistance was encountered and they stopped for the night. The next morning, the Burgermeister was contacted and surrender of the town and garrison was requested on threat of destruction. The request was refused. While directing operations against a heavily defended roadblock in the center of town, Capt. J. Laverne Nicklas, Commander of 2nd Company, was killed by a sniper. The Task Force companies pulled back from the town and 1st Company destroyed Thierbach with direct fire, taking seventy five prisoners, including a colonel. Units of Co. A, with part of the 347th Infantry Regiment advanced through more small towns and were able to seize a bridge over the White Elster River in Plauen. They then drove through Plauen to Oelsnitz, meeting no resistance but firing on fleeing Germans. Co. C seized the bridge at Elsterberg, destroying an 88mm anti-tank gun, and secured the high ground east of town.

On 18 and 19 April, Task Force Sundt remained in place patrolling to the east and on the 20th, the TF, less the infantry company, assembled in the vicinity of Neuensalz. This 2nd TF Sundt had traveled 109 miles and captured 1344 prisoners in nine days. The Germans had pitted the 11th Panzer Division, the so-called "Ghost Division", in the 87th Division's zone to "stem the tide" to no avail. Two tanks, 11 trucks, 4 half-tracks, 3 armored cars, 6 wagons, 3 tractors, 3 motorcycles, 3-75mm guns and 1-105mm gun were destroyed while losing 1 tank, 2 M-8's, 1-M-20 and 1 half-track. During the two-week period of 23 April – 6 May, elements of the Battalion remained in defensive positions, conducting equipment maintenance. To prevent unnecessary casualties, as Russian and American forces closed, limiting lines were established. For the 87th Division it was the Mulde River. On the 6th, the Task Force was dissolved while the 346th and 347th IR's, with Companies A and C in support, advanced about 12 miles to the east toward Falkenstein. On 7 May, the Battalion CP, Reconnaissance Company and Company B moved to Friedrichsgrün, four miles southeast of Falkenstein. On the 8th and 9th, Companies A and C assembled with the Battalion. Peace had been signed. The greatest of all wars was finished and the lights went on again all over Europe.

Following a period serving as occupation troops, the 607th departed Marseille, France, aboard the USAT George Washington, arriving in the Port of New York, NY, on 26 October 1945. The unit was deactivated on 27 October 1945, at Camp Kilmer, New Jersey.
