= Moxa =

Moxa may refer to:

- Moxa, material used in moxibustion, a Chinese traditional medicine
- Mihail Moxa (1550–1650), Romanian historiographer and translator
- Moxa, Thuringia, Germany, municipality
- Moxa Technologies, Taiwanese company
