= Angerdorf =

Type of village in Germany or Austria

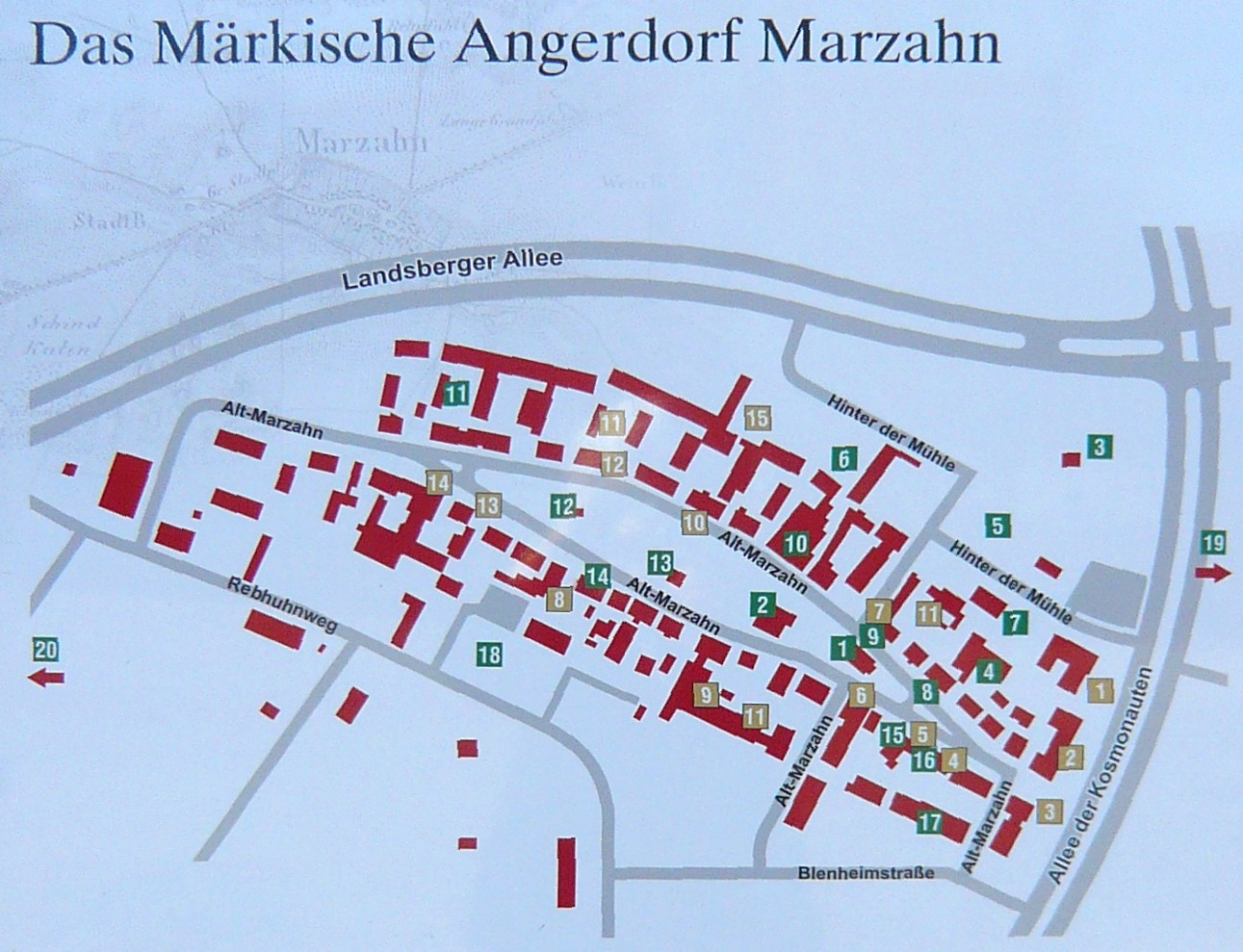
The Angerdorf of Marzahn

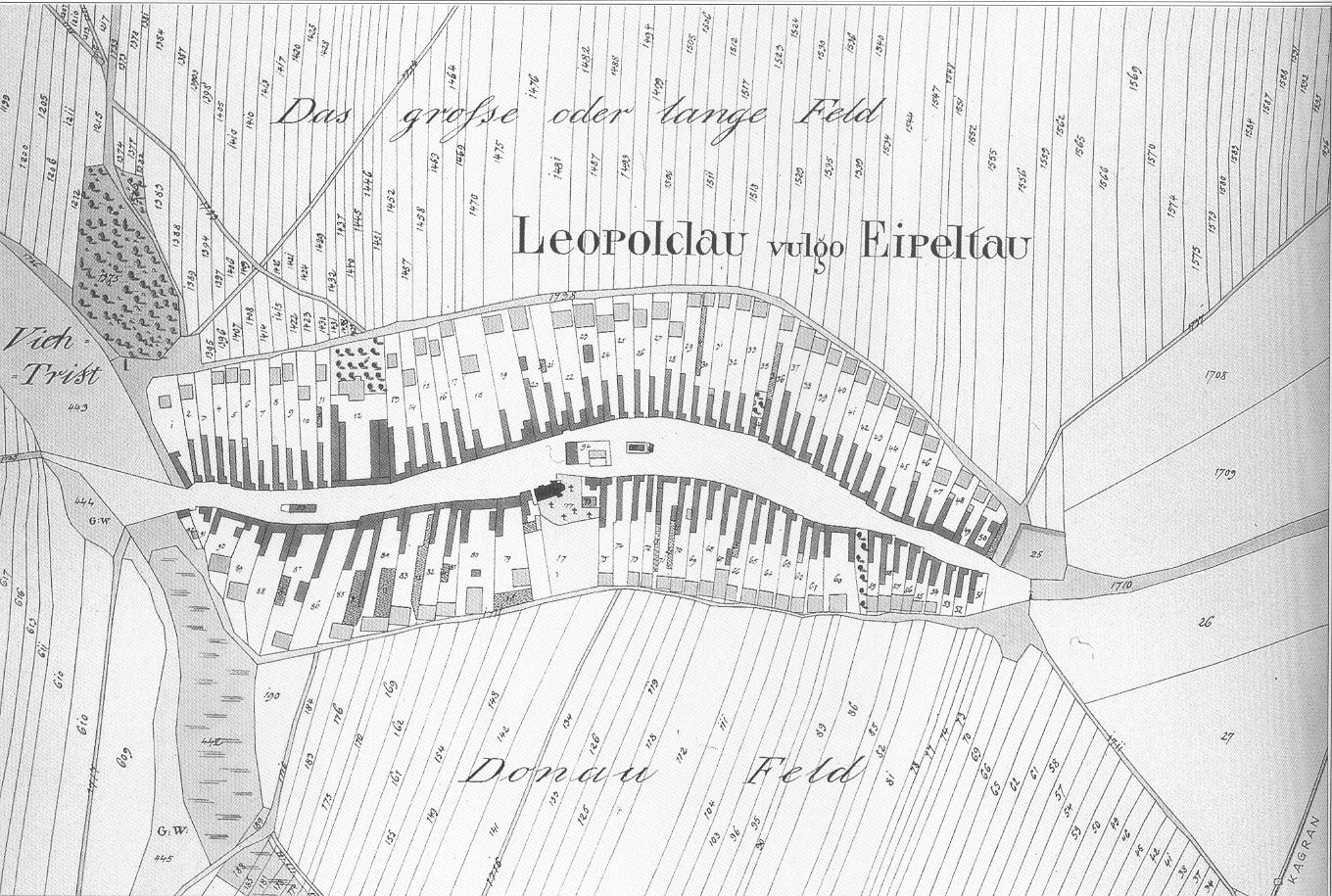
Historical map of Leopoldau, Vienna - an Angerdorf

An Angerdorf (German pronunciation: [ˈaŋɐdɔʁf]; plural: Angerdörfer) is a type of village that is characterised by the houses and farmsteads being laid out around a central grassed area, the anger (from the Old High German angar =pasture or grassy place), a village green which was common land, owned jointly by the village community. The anger is usually in the shape of a lens or an eye, but may also take other forms: a rectangle, triangle, circle or semi-circle (illustrated). The buildings are oriented with their eaves facing the road. Livestock stalls and barns are at the rear of the plot (in Austria called the Hintaus) and may be linked by a farm track that runs around the village forming an outer ring.

There is often a village pond on the anger and sometimes a stream flows through it which may not be easy to recognise today where the groundwater level has changed. The waterbody may well be the reason the anger was chosen. Originally there were no buildings on the anger, but in the course of time other community facilities were often built on it, such as the village church, village school or a smithy.

Angerdörfer occur in Central Europe, especially on ground moraine plates and in loess-covered terrain. In Germany they are common in East Germany and east Central Germany. They were often established during the period of German Ostkolonisation in the Middle Ages and in many western Hungarian villages (for example in Burgenland's Loretto, formerly in Hungary, with the largest anger in Europe) the original layout has survived.

In Austria this type of village occurs predominantly in the Waldviertel and Weinviertel provinces of Lower Austria, in the Vienna Basin, in Burgenland and in east and south Styria.

There are also Angerdörfer in Lorraine in the vicinity of the Franco-German language boundary (e. g. Sommerviller) and in North England (e. g. Maulds Meaburn).

== Gallery ==
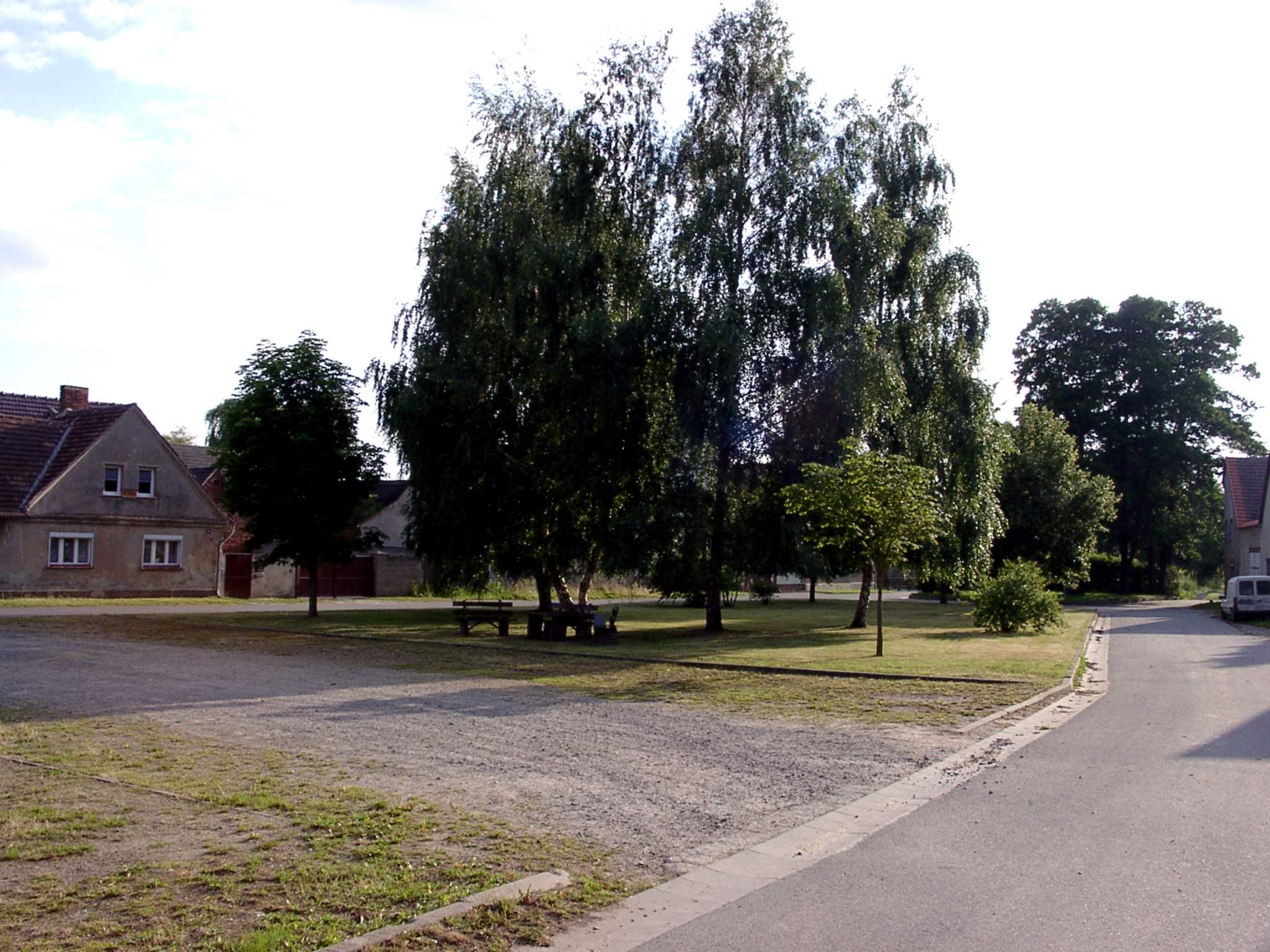
Dorfanger of Schilda (Brandenburg)

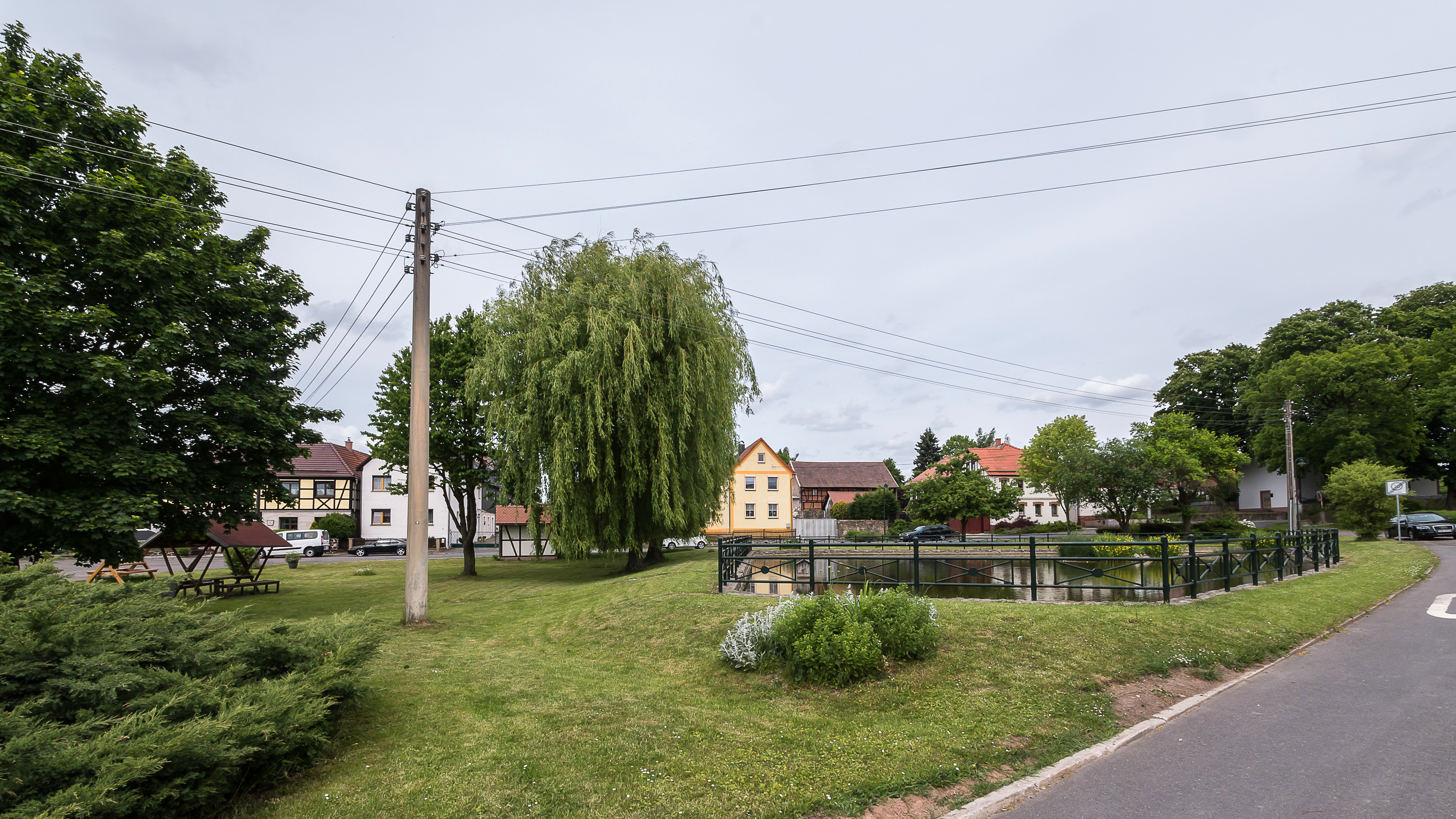
Anger of Schmorda (Thuringia)

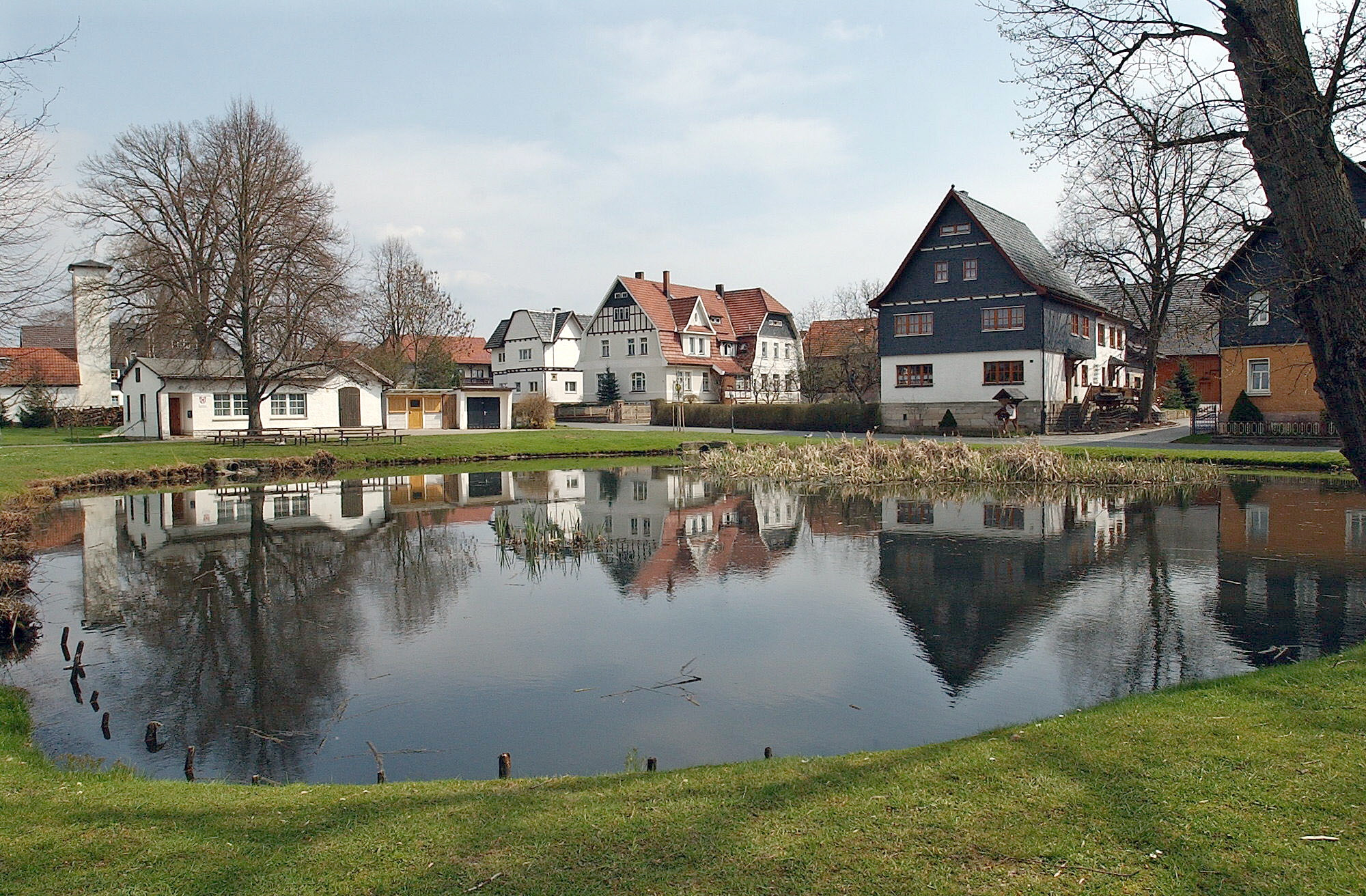
Village pond in the anger of Hönbach (Thuringia)
