= Eva Chen =

Taiwanese businessperson

- 陳怡樺
- Born: Yi-Fen Chen; 1959 (age 66–67); Taichung, Taiwan
- Education: National Chengchi University (BA); University of Texas at Austin (MS)
- Occupations: Entrepreneur, business executive
- Children: 2

Eva Yi-Hwa Chen (Chinese: 陳怡樺) is a Taiwanese business executive and the co-founder and chief executive of Trend Micro, one of the world's largest software security firms. In 2010, CRN Magazine named her as one of the "Top 100 Most Influential Executives in the Industry". She was fifth on the 2012 Forbes list of "Asia's 50 Power Businesswomen".

== Early life and education ==
Chen was born in Taichung, Taiwan.

Chen graduated from National Chengchi University in Taipei with a bachelor's degree in philosophy. After graduation, she worked briefly in the publishing industry. In 1984, she moved to United States and earned a master's degree in management information systems from the University of Texas at Dallas. Back in Taiwan, she worked briefly for Acer Inc. in their research department before leaving to write for a Chinese newspaper.

== Career ==
In 1988, she co-founded Trend Micro with her brother-in-law Steve Chang and her sister Jenny. Chen was executive vice president of the company until 1996 when she became chief technology officer. During her tenure as CTO she devised the Network VirusWall.

In 2005, she assumed the position of chief executive at Trend Micro. Under her leadership, Trend Micro has shifted its focus from traditional antivirus to cloud protection, purchasing Canadian security company Third Brigade in 2009 and cloud storage service humyo in 2010.

In 2012, she received a Cloud Security Alliance Industry Leadership Award for her contributions to cloud security in the Asia-Pacific region.

== Personal life ==
Chen is married to Daniel Chiang, co-founder of Sina.com. In 2006, the Securities and Exchange Commission investigated her for possibly underreporting her Trend Micro holdings.

She resides primarily in Pasadena, California, with her son Peter and daughter Melody.
