= Tomofun =

Pet technology startup

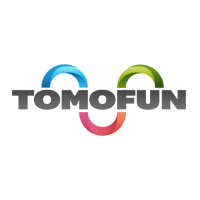
- Type: Privately held
- Industry: Consumer electronics
- Founded: 2014
- Founder: Victor Chang
- Headquarters: Seattle
- Website: Official website

Tomofun is an international pet technology startup founded in 2014 by Victor Chang and mentored by Steve Chang, chairman of the global software security company Trend Micro.

Tomofun's debut product, Furbo, an interactive pet camera, was launched through the crowdfunding website Indiegogo in 2016 and became one of the fastest growing crowdfunding campaigns in history, reaching its crowdfunding goal in less than 8 hours.

== Products ==
Furbo Dog Camera

Furbo Dog Camera, launched in April 2016 through an Indiegogo crowdfunding campaign, is an interactive pet camera designed specifically for dogs that features 2-way audio, live video streaming, and a "treat-tossing" feature that allows users to launch treats in the air in order to remotely play and interact with their pets. It has been featured in online consumer tech publications including The Verge, TechCrunch, and Gizmodo and has become one of the fastest growing crowdfunding campaigns on Indiegogo.

Furbo Nanny

Furbo Nanny is a dog monitoring service that alerts dog owners to dog activities and potential dangers in real-time. Notifications such as Dog Activity Alert, Person Alert, and Selfie Alert allow dog owners to know what is happening at home.
