= Mona Jhaveri =

American scientist and entrepreneur

Mona S. Jhaveri
- Education: SUNY Binghamton, Wake Forest School of Medicine
- Known for: Cancer research and entrepreneurship
- Spouse: Michael Irwin Brown
- Scientific career
- Fields: Biochemistry and Biotechnology
- Workplaces: Foligo Therapeutics Inc and Sound Affects

Mona Jhaveri is an American biotech scientist and entrepreneur notable for innovative approaches to cancer research, detection, and funding. From 2005 to 2010, she founded and ran Foligo Therapeutics Inc., a biotech startup that worked to develop and commercialize a DNA-based compound as a potential treatment for ovarian cancer. She is also the founder and executive director of Sound Affects, a nonprofit organization dedicated to improving financing for cancer research through collaboration with musicians.

== Education ==
Jhaveri received a bachelor's degree from SUNY Binghamton, and a doctorate in biochemistry from the Wake Forest School of Medicine.

== Career ==
Jhaveri worked as a postdoc at the National Cancer Institute in Maryland (1997–2001), where she co-discovered the compound FOLIGO 002 with Patrick Elwood. She continued to develop the compound as a potential cancer therapeutic at Georgetown Lombardi Comprehensive Cancer Center.

From 2002 to 2005 she specialized in intellectual property and technology transfer at the Ludwig Institute for Cancer Research in New York City, where she filed patents for vaccines and licensed them to biotechnology and pharmaceutical companies.

In 2006, she founded Foligo Therapeutics, a biotech company with a mission of developing ways to improve the detection and treatment of ovarian cancer. This included working to commercialize a DNA-based therapeutic compound as a potential treatment for ovarian cancer. Foligo Therapeutics later folded due to lack of funds.

Subsequently, Jhaveri founded Sound Affects, a non-profit organization dedicated to "changing how the war on cancer is fought and financed." Sound Affects, using a crowd-funding model, partners with independent musical artists to raise awareness and funding for cancer campaigns. Artists are motivated to raise money knowing that if they win, they can perform at an event that will provide them with exposure. For example, two acts participating with Sound Affects in 2015 raised enough money to win an opportunity to perform during New York Fashion Week.

== Awards and honors ==
Jhaveri received the SPORE Fellowship Award for Breast Cancer Research at the Georgetown Lombardi Comprehensive Cancer Center in 2001. In 2008, she received the Cartier Women's Initiative Award, which was granted to five female entrepreneurs selected by an international jury of entrepreneurs and members of the business community for the creativity, sustainability, and social impact of their start-up projects.

In 2017, Jhaveri was invited to appear on the 2018 SXSW lineup to present her innovative work with Sound Affects.

== Personal life ==
Jhaveri is married and the mother of two children, Arthur and Pearla.

== Selected publications ==
- Mona S. Jhaveri, Antonina S. Rait, Koong-Nah Chung, Jane B. Trepel, Esther H. Chang (2004) Antisense oligonucleotides targeted to the human α folate receptor inhibit breast cancer cell growth and sensitize the cells to doxorubicin treatment. Molecular Cancer Therapeutics 3: 1505–12
- Jhaveri, Mona S.; Wagner, Conrad; Trepel, Jane B. (2001-12-01). "Impact of Extracellular Folate Levels on Global Gene Expression". Molecular Pharmacology. 60 (6). American Society for Pharmacology & Experimental Therapeutics (ASPET): 1288–1295. doi:10.1124/mol.60.6.1288. ISSN 0026-895X. PMID 11723236.
- Jhaveri, Mona S.; Morrow, Charles S. (1998). "Methylation-mediated regulation of the glutathione S-transferase P1 gene in human breast cancer cells". Gene. 210 (1). Elsevier BV: 1–7. doi:10.1016/s0378-1119(98)00021-3. ISSN 0378-1119. PMID 9524203.
