= Alice Chang =

Alice Chang may refer to:

- Sun-Yung Alice Chang (born 1948), Taiwanese-American mathematician
- Alice Chien Chang (1950–2026), Taiwanese molecular biologist and neuroscientist
