= Eßbach =

- Municipality
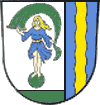
- Coat of arms

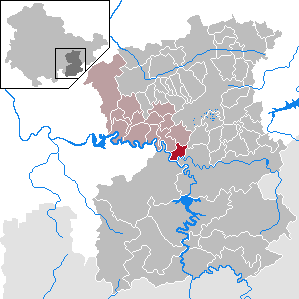
- Location of Eßbach within Saale-Orla-Kreis district
- Interactive map of Eßbach
- Location within Germany Location within Thuringia
- Coordinates: 50°35′N 11°41′E
- Country: Germany
- State: Thuringia
- District: Saale-Orla-Kreis
- Municipal assoc.: Ranis-Ziegenrück

Government
  - Mayor (2022–28): Joachim Haueisen

Area
  - Total: 5.28 km^{2} (2.04 sq mi)
- Elevation: 433 m (1,421 ft)

Population (2025-12-31)
  - Total: 228
  - Density: 43.2/km^{2} (112/sq mi)
- Time zone: UTC+01:00 (CET)
  - Summer (DST): UTC+02:00 (CEST)
- Postal codes: 07924
- Dialling codes: 036483
- Vehicle registration: SOK

Eßbach is a municipality in the district Saale-Orla-Kreis, in Thuringia, Germany.
