= Wilhelmsdorf, Thuringia =

Wilhelmsdorf
- Municipality
- Coat of arms

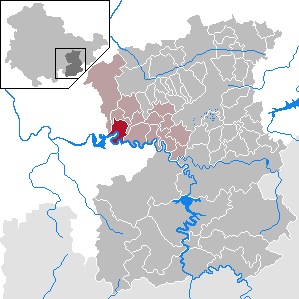
- Location of Wilhelmsdorf within Saale-Orla-Kreis district
- Interactive map of Wilhelmsdorf
- Location within Germany Location within Thuringia
- Coordinates: 50°37′48″N 11°33′2″E
- Country: Germany
- State: Thuringia
- District: Saale-Orla-Kreis
- Municipal assoc.: Ranis-Ziegenrück

Government
  - Mayor (2022–28): Anke Czieslik

Area
  - Total: 9.33 km^{2} (3.60 sq mi)
- Elevation: 427 m (1,401 ft)

Population (2025-12-31)
  - Total: 192
  - Density: 20.6/km^{2} (53.3/sq mi)
- Time zone: UTC+01:00 (CET)
  - Summer (DST): UTC+02:00 (CEST)
- Postal codes: 07389
- Dialling codes: 03647
- Vehicle registration: SOK
- Website: www.vg-ranis-ziegenrueck.de

Wilhelmsdorf (German pronunciation: [ˈvɪlhɛlmsˌdɔʁf]) is a municipality in the district Saale-Orla-Kreis, in Thuringia, Germany.
