= Keila, Germany =

Keila
- Municipality
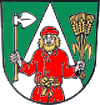
- Coat of arms

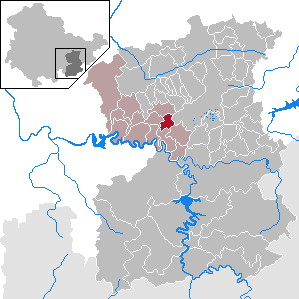
- Location of Keila within Saale-Orla-Kreis district
- Interactive map of Keila
- Location within Germany Location within Thuringia
- Coordinates: 50°38′16″N 11°39′44″E
- Country: Germany
- State: Thuringia
- District: Saale-Orla-Kreis
- Municipal assoc.: Ranis-Ziegenrück

Government
  - Mayor (2022–28): Lutz Mordt

Area
  - Total: 4.16 km^{2} (1.61 sq mi)
- Elevation: 455 m (1,493 ft)

Population (2025-12-31)
  - Total: 73
  - Density: 18/km^{2} (45/sq mi)
- Time zone: UTC+01:00 (CET)
  - Summer (DST): UTC+02:00 (CEST)
- Postal codes: 07389
- Dialling codes: 036483
- Vehicle registration: SOK
- Website: www.vg-ranis-ziegenrueck.de

Keila (German pronunciation: [ˈkaɪla]) is a municipality in the district Saale-Orla-Kreis, in Thuringia, Germany.

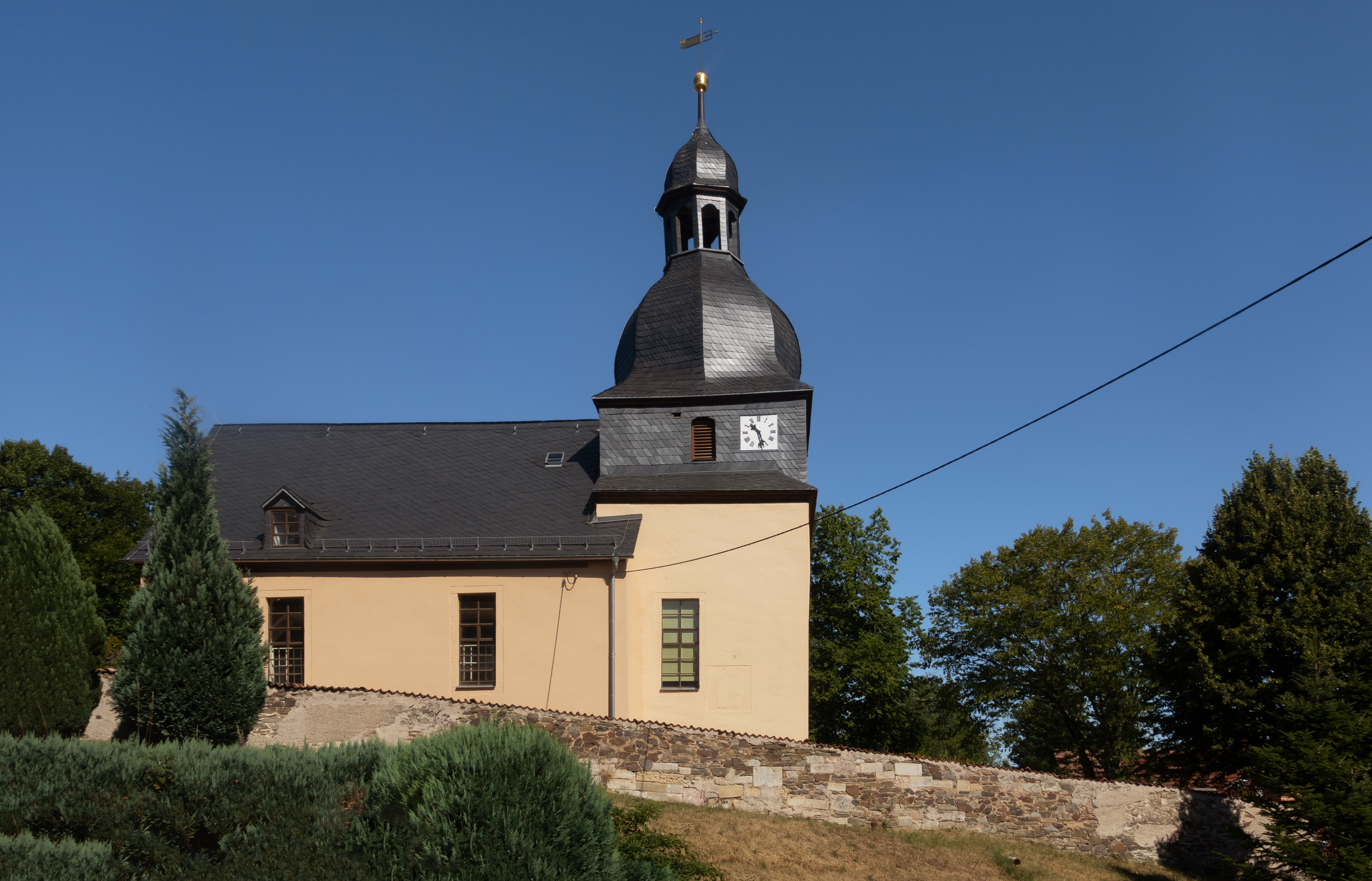
Keila, the church of the village
