= Krölpa =

- Municipality
- Coat of arms

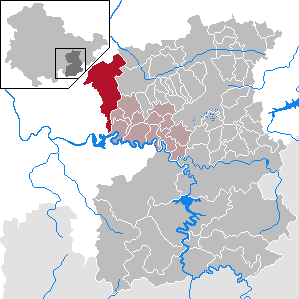
- Location of Krölpa within Saale-Orla-Kreis district
- Interactive map of Krölpa
- Location within Germany Location within Thuringia
- Coordinates: 50°40′N 11°31′E
- Country: Germany
- State: Thuringia
- District: Saale-Orla-Kreis
- Municipal assoc.: Ranis-Ziegenrück
- Subdivisions: 10

Government
  - Mayor (2021–27): Jonas Chudasch

Area
  - Total: 42.28 km^{2} (16.32 sq mi)
- Elevation: 250 m (820 ft)

Population (2025-12-31)
  - Total: 2,543
  - Density: 60.15/km^{2} (155.8/sq mi)
- Time zone: UTC+01:00 (CET)
  - Summer (DST): UTC+02:00 (CEST)
- Postal codes: 07387
- Dialling codes: 03647
- Vehicle registration: SOK
- Website: www.gemeinde-kroelpa.de

Krölpa (German pronunciation: [ˈkʁœlpa]) is a municipality in the district Saale-Orla-Kreis, in Thuringia, Germany.
