= SpySubtract =

- Screenshot of SpySubtract Pro, version 2.61
- Developer(s): InterMute, Inc
- Initial release: 13 August 2003; 21 years ago
- Final release: 3.0
- Operating system: Microsoft Windows
- Size: 2 MB
- Type: Spyware removal software
- Website: www.intermute.com:80/products/spysubtract.html

SpySubtract was the name of an Anti-Spyware application for Microsoft Windows developed by InterMute. It was maintained by Trend Micro under the new name of Trend Micro Anti-Spyware, which came into effect from version 3.0. Previous versions did not have the Trend Micro branding.

Trend Micro Anti-Spyware was later discontinued on November 30, 2007, and replaced with Trend Micro AntiVirus plus AntiSpyware 2008.

The program is shareware, and was available to download as a 30-day trial.

Previously, SpySubtract was often pre-installed on new desktop and notebook computers.
