= Steve Chang =

Businessman from Taiwan

- 張明正
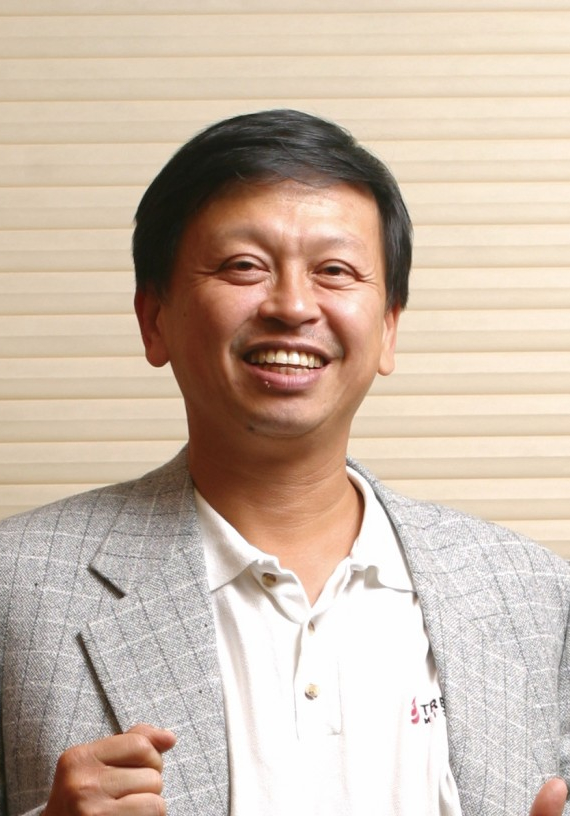
- Born: Ming-chen Chang; 1954 (age 71–72); Pingtung, Taiwan
- Education: Fu Jen Catholic University (BS); Lehigh University (MS)
- Occupations: Chairman, Trend Micro
- Awards: Fu Jen Outstanding Alumni Award (1999); CNBC 8th Asian Business Leaders Award (2009)

Steve Chang (Chinese: 張明正; born 1954) is a Taiwanese businessman who is the founder, chairman, and former CEO of Trend Micro, one of the largest software security firms in the world. He was named "Star of Asia" by the Business Week in 1999, and he was selected as one of the six protagonists of the Discovery Channel's Portraits Taiwan II in 2006.

== Life ==
Chang was born in Pingtung, Taiwan. After graduating from National Pingtung Senior High School, Chang attended Fu Jen Catholic University's Department of Mathematics where he earned a bachelor's degree in 1977, then he studied in the United States and obtained a master's degree in computer science from Lehigh University in 1979.

After returning to Taiwan, he worked for Hewlett-Packard and was the head of sales operations in seven counties and cities in southern Taiwan. In 1988, he founded Trend Micro in the US with his wife Jenny Chen (陳怡蓁) and his wife's sister Eva Chen (陳怡樺).

In 1999, Chang won the Fu Jen Outstanding Alumni Award with the Harvard University professor Lee-Jen Wei and nine other people. In the same year, he was also named "Star of Asia" by the Business Week. One decade later, Chang won the CNBC 8th Asian Business Leaders Award.

He retired in 2006, and lives in Hualien, Taiwan.

== See also ==
- Trend Micro
- Tomofun
