= Ranis =

- Town
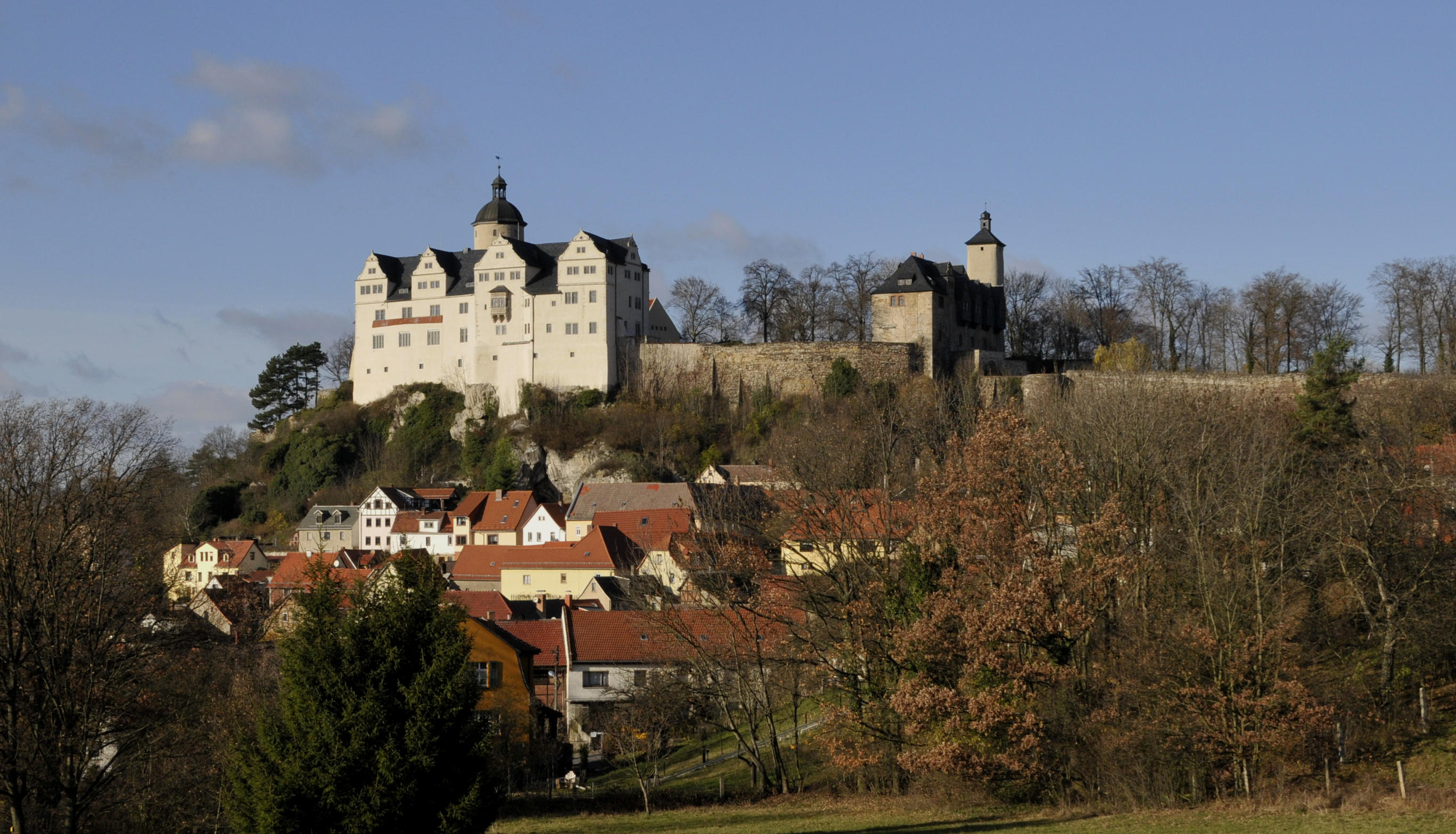
- Ranis Castle

- Coat of arms

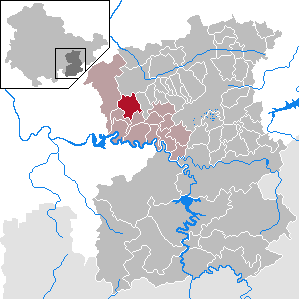
- Location of Ranis within Saale-Orla-Kreis district
- Interactive map of Ranis
- Location within Germany Location within Thuringia
- Coordinates: 50°39′50″N 11°34′5″E
- Country: Germany
- State: Thuringia
- District: Saale-Orla-Kreis
- Municipal assoc.: Ranis-Ziegenrück
- Subdivisions: 4

Government
  - Mayor (2022–28): Marcus Pavel

Area
  - Total: 10.57 km^{2} (4.08 sq mi)
- Elevation: 380 m (1,250 ft)

Population (2025-12-31)
  - Total: 1,680
  - Density: 159/km^{2} (412/sq mi)
- Time zone: UTC+01:00 (CET)
  - Summer (DST): UTC+02:00 (CEST)
- Postal codes: 07389
- Dialling codes: 03647
- Vehicle registration: SOK
- Website: www.stadt-ranis.de

Ranis (German pronunciation: [ˈʁaːnɪs]) is a town in the Saale-Orla-Kreis district, in Thuringia, Germany. It is situated 15 km east of Saalfeld, and 30 km south of Jena.

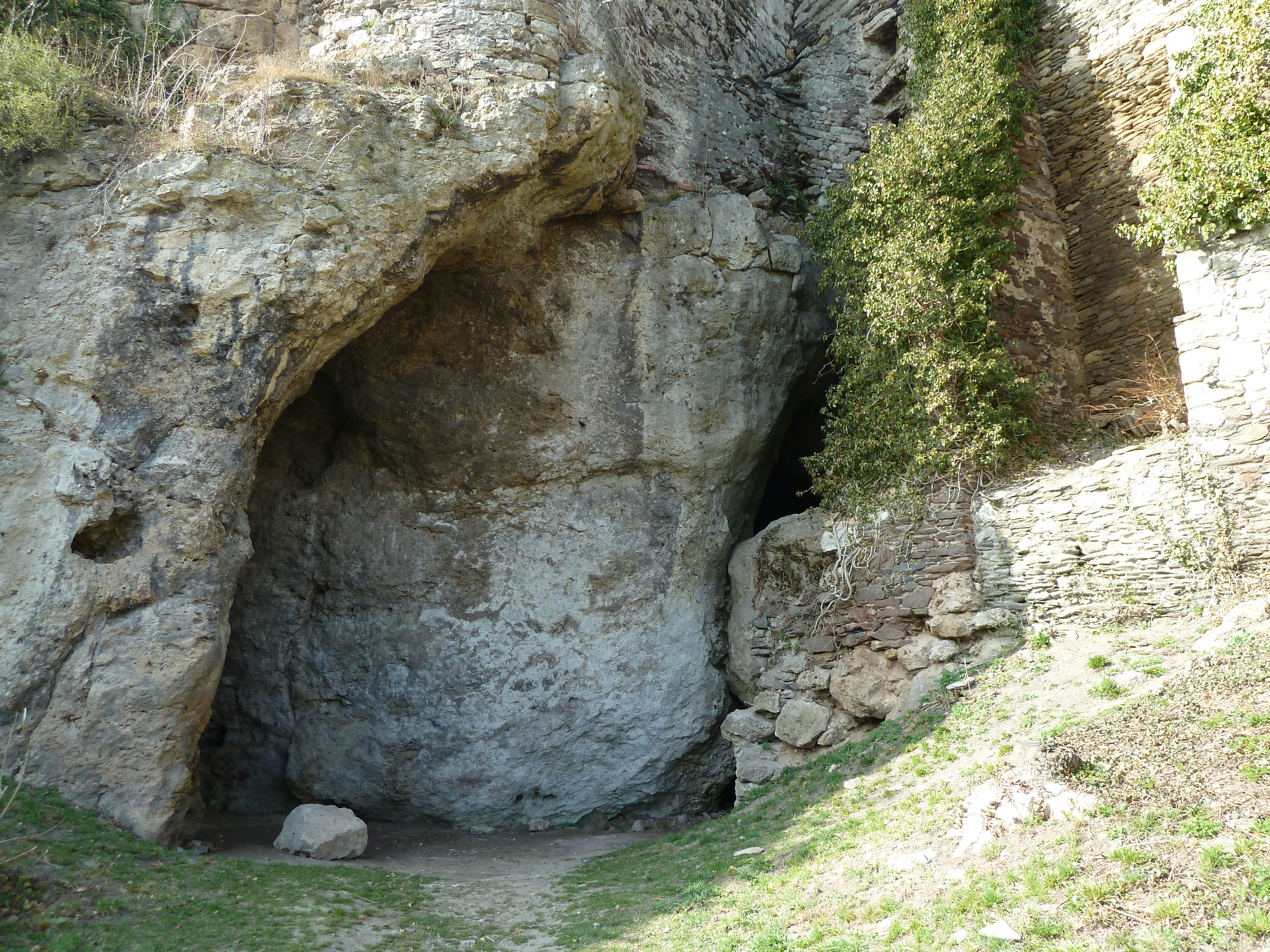
The cave Ilsenhöhle under Ranis Castle, where up 47-45,000 years old Homo sapiens remains were found, among the oldest in Europe, associated with the LRJ archaeological culture.

== Demographics ==
=== Historical population ===
(As of 31 December 1994):

Historical population

Year	Pop.	±% p.a.
1779	290 (Note: over 10 years)	—
1831	928	+2.26%
1885	1,888	+1.32%
1933	2,232	+0.35%
1939	2,359	+0.93%
1994	1,972	−0.33%
1995	1,981	+0.46%
1996	1,960	−1.06%
1997	2,060	+5.10%
1998	2,060	+0.00%

Year	Pop.	±% p.a.
1999	2,052	−0.39%
2000	2,025	−1.32%
2001	2,034	+0.44%
2002	2,027	−0.34%
2003	2,017	−0.49%
2004	1,982	−1.74%
2005	1,965	−0.86%
2006	1,919	−2.34%
2007	1,884	−1.82%
2008	1,866	−0.96%

Year	Pop.	±% p.a.
2009	1,824	−2.25%
2010	1,812	−0.66%
2011	1,744	−3.75%
2012	1,725	−1.09%
2013	1,707	−1.04%
2014	1,690	−1.00%
2015	1,709	+1.12%
2016	1,720	+0.64%

Source: Data since 1994: Thuringian State Statistical Bureau.
