= Paska, Germany =

Paska
- Municipality
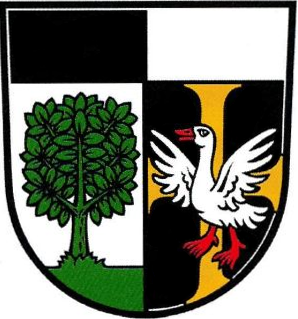
- Coat of arms

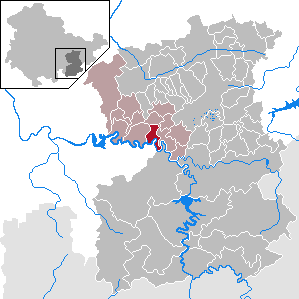
- Location of Paska within Saale-Orla-Kreis district
- Interactive map of Paska
- Location within Germany Location within Thuringia
- Coordinates: 50°37′15″N 11°37′44″E
- Country: Germany
- State: Thuringia
- District: Saale-Orla-Kreis
- Municipal assoc.: Ranis-Ziegenrück

Government
  - Mayor (2022–28): Timo Riemschneider

Area
  - Total: 6.6 km^{2} (2.5 sq mi)
- Elevation: 440 m (1,440 ft)

Population (2025-12-31)
  - Total: 92
  - Density: 14/km^{2} (36/sq mi)
- Time zone: UTC+01:00 (CET)
  - Summer (DST): UTC+02:00 (CEST)
- Postal codes: 07381
- Dialling codes: 036483
- Vehicle registration: SOK

Paska (German pronunciation: [ˈpaska]) is a municipality in the district Saale-Orla-Kreis, in Thuringia, Germany.
