= Ziegenrück =

- Town
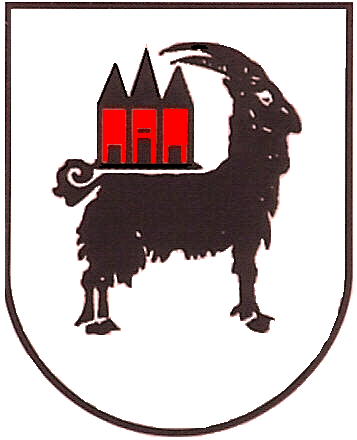
- Coat of arms

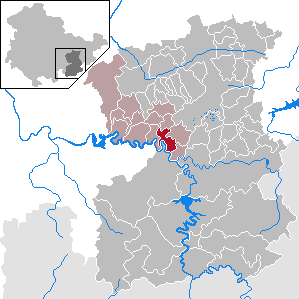
- Location of Ziegenrück within Saale-Orla-Kreis district
- Interactive map of Ziegenrück
- Location within Germany Location within Thuringia
- Coordinates: 50°37′N 11°39′E
- Country: Germany
- State: Thuringia
- District: Saale-Orla-Kreis
- Municipal assoc.: Ranis-Ziegenrück

Government
  - Mayor (2022–28): Chris Lange

Area
  - Total: 8.25 km^{2} (3.19 sq mi)
- Elevation: 318 m (1,043 ft)

Population (2025-12-31)
  - Total: 626
  - Density: 75.9/km^{2} (197/sq mi)
- Time zone: UTC+01:00 (CET)
  - Summer (DST): UTC+02:00 (CEST)
- Postal codes: 07924
- Dialling codes: 036483
- Vehicle registration: SOK
- Website: www.ziegenrueck.de

Ziegenrück (German pronunciation: [ˈtsiːɡn̩ʁʏk]) is a town in the Saale-Orla-Kreis district, in southern Thuringia, Germany. It is situated on the river Saale, 22 km east of Saalfeld, and 35 km south of Jena.

Ziegenrück is Germany's 5th smallest town with 640 inhabitants (2020).

== Tourism ==
Ziegenrück is primarily a tourist destination with several hotels and guesthouses located in the town and an annual overnight visitor count of more than 35,000 visitors per year. The area's hiking paths offer tourists views of the Saale Valley. The town is also visited by mountain biking enthusiasts and canoeing is also a popular pastime.

Also a popular activity in Ziegenrück is the rental of paddleboats and rowboats, which can be rented at the Saalepromenade.

There is also a campground in Ziegenrück, the "Nature Camping Plothental" for visitors who prefer camping over hotels.

== Culture ==
The Waterpower Museum (Wasserkraftmuseum) in Ziegenrück is the only one of its kind in Germany and visitors can learn more about how electricity is generated from the Saale river. There is also a cultural center called the "Poetenstube" (the poet's corner) and an art gallery, specializing in photographic art from around the area and beyond. The Treffpunkt Foto Galerie is located at the Platz der Jugend 1a, across from Treffpunkt Park, a park in the center of town.

== Gallery ==
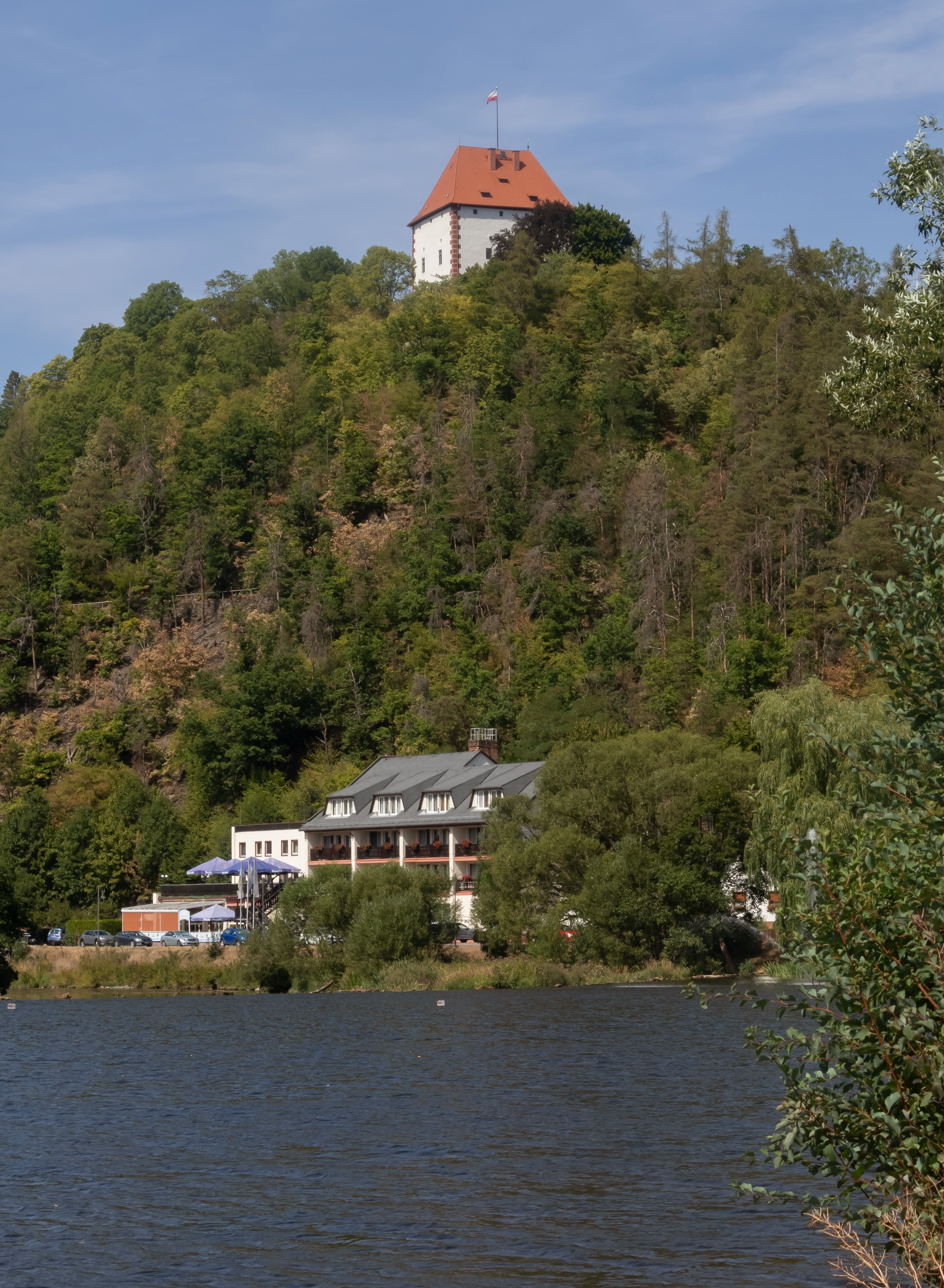
Kemenate Orlamünde (remains of the Burganlage)

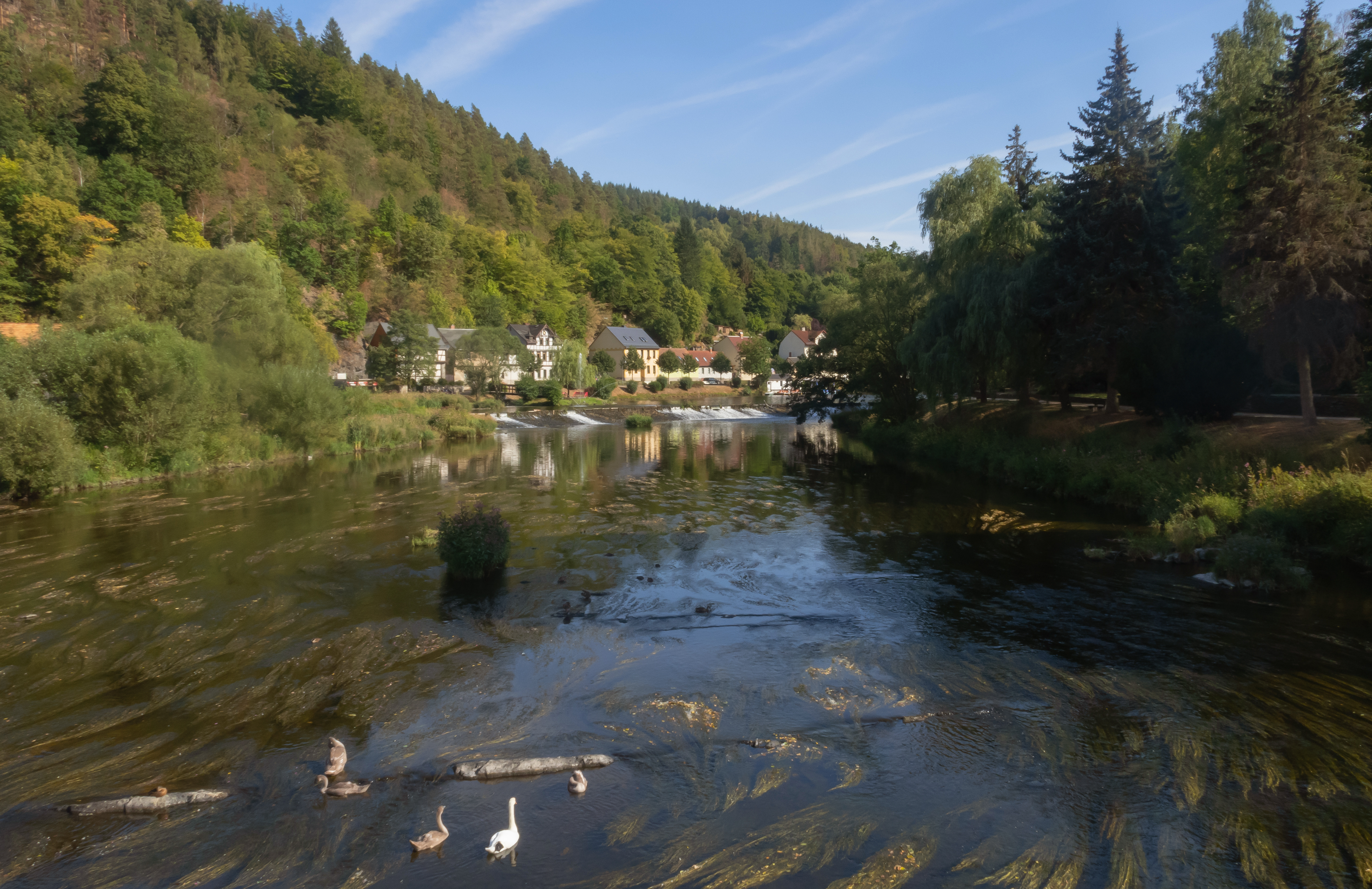
River the Saale from the bridge

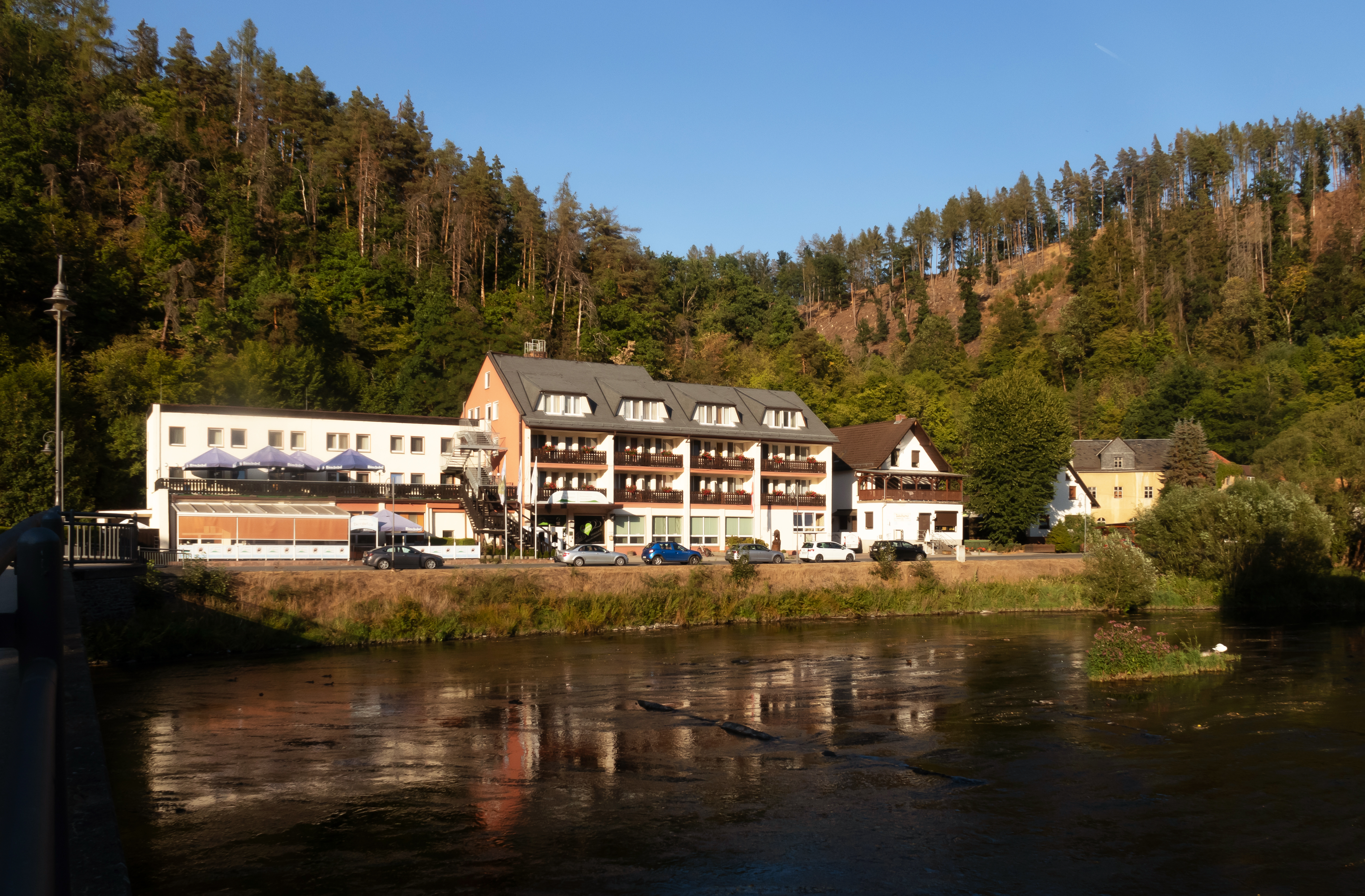
Hotel Am Schlossberg

== Events ==
Events in Ziegenrück include the annual Promenadenfest that takes place every August and also the annual Bergrennen, an uphill timed race event for classic and vintage cars. Twice yearly, there is also a "Wandertag", a guided hike through the area surrounding Ziegenrück.

There are also regularly scheduled literary and poetry readings at the Poetenstube, photographic exhibits at the Treffpunkt Foto Galerie and exhibits at the Wasserkraftmuseum.
