= Gössitz =

- Municipality
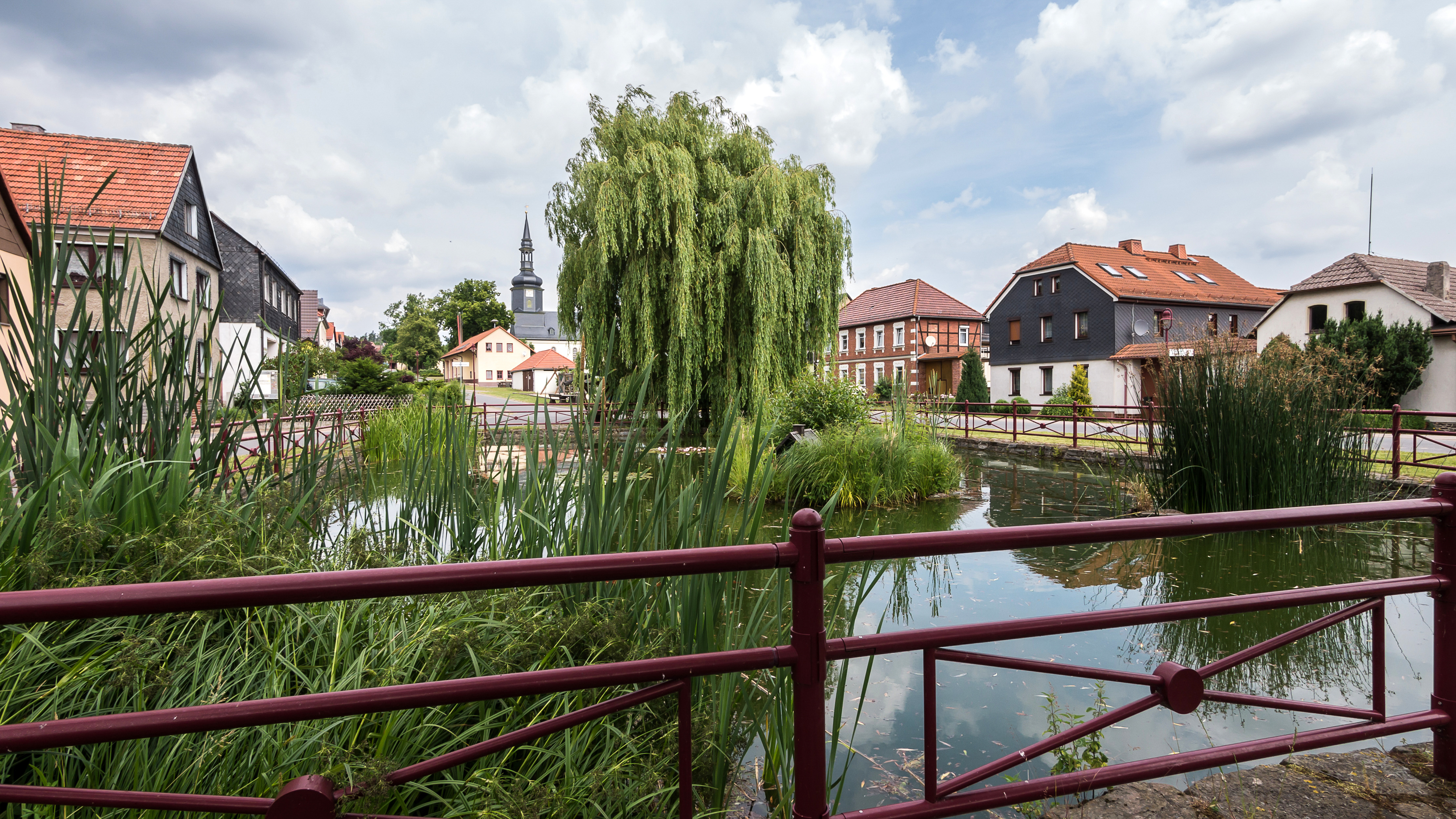
- View of Gössitz

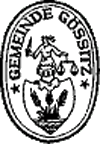
- Coat of arms

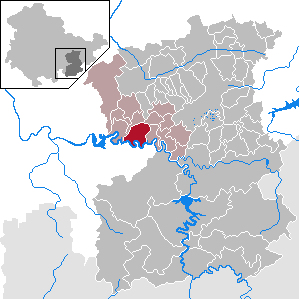
- Location of Gössitz within Saale-Orla-Kreis district
- Interactive map of Gössitz
- Location within Germany Location within Thuringia
- Coordinates: 50°37′14″N 11°35′14″E
- Country: Germany
- State: Thuringia
- District: Saale-Orla-Kreis
- Municipal assoc.: Ranis-Ziegenrück

Government
  - Mayor (2019–25): Sandro Schindler

Area
  - Total: 12.84 km^{2} (4.96 sq mi)
- Elevation: 480 m (1,570 ft)

Population (2025-12-31)
  - Total: 279
  - Density: 21.7/km^{2} (56.3/sq mi)
- Time zone: UTC+01:00 (CET)
  - Summer (DST): UTC+02:00 (CEST)
- Postal codes: 07389
- Dialling codes: 036483
- Vehicle registration: SOK
- Website: www.goessitz.de

Gössitz (German pronunciation: [ˈɡœsɪts]) is a municipality in the district Saale-Orla-Kreis, in Thuringia, Germany.
