= Ranis-Ziegenrück =

Municipality in Thuringia, Germany

- Verwaltungsgemeinschaft
- Map of Saale-Orla-Kreis highlighting Ranis-Ziegenrück
- Interactive map of Ranis-Ziegenrück
- Location within Germany Location within Thuringia
- Coordinates: 50°37′N 11°38′E
- Country: Germany
- State: Thuringia
- District: Saale-Orla-Kreis
- Seat: Ranis
- Subdivisions: 13 municipalities

Area
  - Total: 130.99 km^{2} (50.58 sq mi)

Population (2025-12-31)
  - Total: 6,693
  - Density: 51.10/km^{2} (132.3/sq mi)
- Time zone: UTC+01:00 (CET)
  - Summer (DST): UTC+02:00 (CEST)
- Website: www.vg-ranis-ziegenrueck.de

Ranis-Ziegenrück is a Verwaltungsgemeinschaft ("collective municipality") in the district Saale-Orla-Kreis, in Thuringia, Germany. The seat of the Verwaltungsgemeinschaft is in Ranis.

== Municipalities ==
The Verwaltungsgemeinschaft Ranis-Ziegenrück consists of the following municipalities:

1. Eßbach
2. Gössitz
3. Keila
4. Krölpa
5. Moxa
6. Paska
7. Peuschen
8. Ranis
9. Schmorda
10. Schöndorf
11. Seisla
12. Wilhelmsdorf
13. Ziegenrück
