= Chang Ta-chun =

Taiwanese author and literary critic

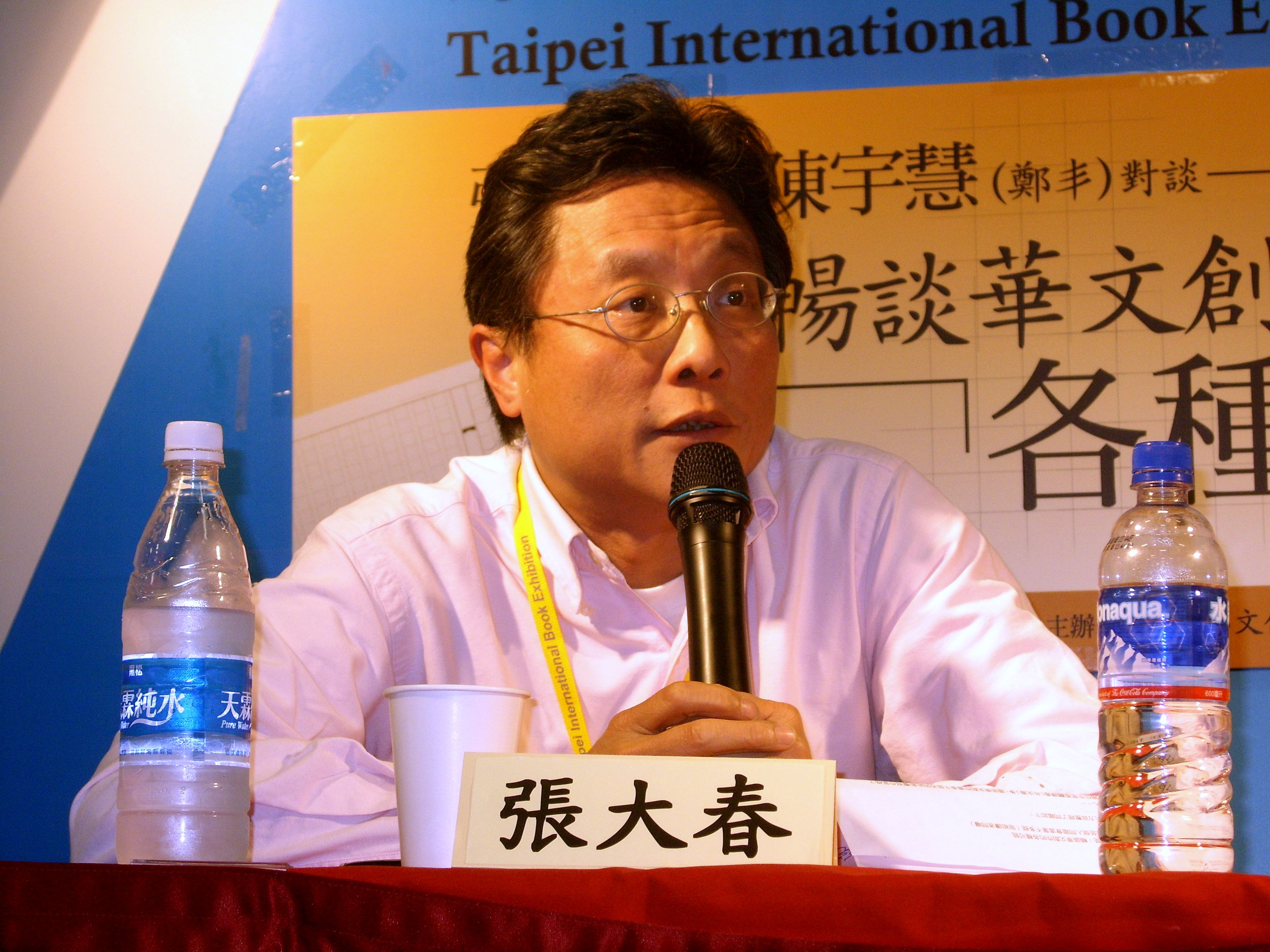
Chang at Taipei International Book Exhibition in 2008.

Chang Ta-chun (Chinese: 張大春; pinyin: Zhāng Dàchūn; Wade–Giles: Chang Ta-ch'un; born 14 June 1957), also known as Dachun Zhang, is a Taiwanese author and literary critic. He is the author of many novels, two of which, Wild Child (野孩子) and My Kid Sister (我妹妹), were published together in the U.S. as Wild Kids (Two Novels about Growing Up) by Columbia University Press (2000), translated from the Chinese by Michael Berry.

Chang began to win acclaim with his first story, "Suspended" (1976). His major breakthrough came in 1986 with his collection of short stories Apartment Building Tour Guide. He also wrote wuxia and science-fiction stories. His "spontaneous news novel" The Grand Liar includes the daily news into the plot and is his most ambitious book.

He also published the novel The Weekly Journal of Young Big Head Spring under the pen name Big Head Spring (Datou Chun). My Kid Sister and Wild Child are the second and third installments of the Big Head Spring Trilogy.

His story "The General's Monument" (Jiangjun bei), included in the collection Lucky Worries About his Country, was published in French under the title La Stèle du général (Éditions Picquier, 1993, ISBN 2-87730-700-X), translated by Mathilde Chou and Pierre Charau, and in German under the title Ein Denkmal für den General (projekt verlag, Dortmund 1995, ISBN 3-928861-39-5), translated by Susanne Ettl-Hornfeck.

In the 1990s Chang Ta-chun produced and hosted two popular television shows. As a reporter, he worked for the China Times.

He has a cameo in Hou Hsiao-hsien's film City of Sadness.

== Educational background ==
- B.A. and M.A. from Fu Jen Catholic University.

== Works ==
- "Suspended" (Xuandang), 1976
- Apartment Building Tour Guide (Gongyu daoyu) (short stories, 1986)
- Lucky Worries About his Country (Sixi youguo) (short stories, 1988)
- Happy Thieves (Huanxi zei) (short stories, 1989)
- Pathological Changes (Bingbian) (short stories, 1990)
- The Grand Liar (Da shuoshuang jia) (novel, 1990)
- The Weekly Journal of Young Big Head Spring (Shaonian Datou Chun de shenghuo zhouji) (novel, 1992)
- My Kid Sister (Wo meimei) (novel, 1993)
- No One Wrote a Letter to the Colonel (Meiren xiezin gei shangxiao) (novel, 1994)
- Wild Child (Ye haizi) (novel, 1996)
- Disciples of the Liar (Sahuang de xintu) (novel, 1996)
