= Humyo =

Cloud storage service

humyo.com
- Company type: Private Limited
- Founded: 2007
- Headquarters: London and Berlin
- Key people: Peter Dubens (Chairman); Dan Conlon (MD); Amjid Zaman (FD)
- Products: Online file storage
- Number of employees: 11 (August 2008)

humyo.com was a cloud storage service. Files stored in humyo could be shared with other users and published on web pages. The company owned a former Bank of England bullion vault in which it housed the servers used to store its users' data.

== Company history ==
humyo.com was founded in 2007 by Dan Conlon (MD), Mark Beyer (CMO) and Peter Dubens (Chairman) and initially offered 30GB of storage space for free.

The company closed its beta in March 2008 with 100,000 users and by August 2008 had 215,000.

In October 2008, the company reduced the amount of storage space offered free of charge to new users to 10GB. (5GB for Pictures, Videos, and Music and 5GB for Other files)

On 11 June 2010 it was announced that the company was acquired by Japanese anti-virus company Trend Micro.

In September 2010 the service was re-branded to Trend Micro SafeSync. SafeSync reached End of Life on 31 January 2016 and Trend Micro announced end of service on 31 January 2017 because they “cannot feasibly adapt/update the service to meet the changing consumer needs, environment, and IT usage”. While the company accepted subscription payments to SafeSync way past the EOL/EOS, the company made available no compensation plans to consumer who prepaid long periods of subscriptions as of May 2016.
