= Peuschen =

- Municipality
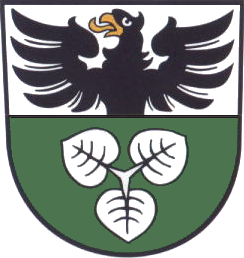
- Coat of arms

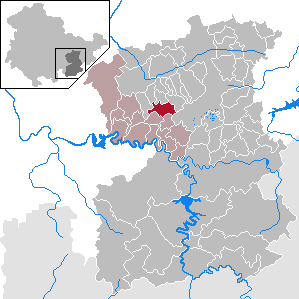
- Location of Peuschen within Saale-Orla-Kreis district
- Interactive map of Peuschen
- Location within Germany Location within Thuringia
- Coordinates: 50°39′32″N 11°38′37″E
- Country: Germany
- State: Thuringia
- District: Saale-Orla-Kreis
- Municipal assoc.: Ranis-Ziegenrück

Government
  - Mayor (2022–28): Stefan Fröhlich

Area
  - Total: 7.55 km^{2} (2.92 sq mi)
- Elevation: 470 m (1,540 ft)

Population (2025-12-31)
  - Total: 430
  - Density: 57/km^{2} (150/sq mi)
- Time zone: UTC+01:00 (CET)
  - Summer (DST): UTC+02:00 (CEST)
- Postal codes: 07389
- Dialling codes: 03647
- Vehicle registration: SOK
- Website: www.vg-ranis-ziegenrueck.de

Peuschen (German pronunciation: [ˈpɔʏʃn̩]) is a municipality in the district Saale-Orla-Kreis, in Thuringia, Germany.
