= Wei-min Hao =

Atmospheric chemist and climatologist

- 郝慰民
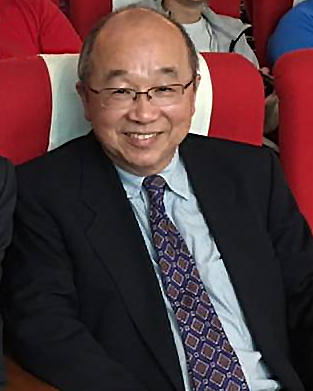
- Hao in Fu Jen Catholic University in 2018
- Born: 7 April 1953 (age 72); Taiwan
- Education: Fu Jen Catholic University (BS); Massachusetts Institute of Technology (MS); Harvard University (PhD)
- Scientific career
- Fields: Atmospheric chemistry
- Institutions: United States Department of Agriculture
- Thesis: Industrial sources of atmospheric N₂O, CH₃Cl and CH₃Br (1986)

Wei-Min Hao (Chinese: 郝慰民; born 7 April 1953) is a Taiwanese-American atmospheric chemist, climatologist, and currently works in the United States Department of Agriculture. His work directly contributed to the reason for awarding the 2007 Nobel Peace Prize. He is a member of the United States Agency for International Development (USAID) and an author of the Intergovernmental Panel on Climate Change (IPCC).

== Biography ==
After graduating from Taipei Municipal Jianguo High School, Hao earned a B.S. in chemistry from Fu Jen Catholic University, an M.S. from the Massachusetts Institute of Technology (MIT), and his Ph.D. in atmospheric chemistry from Harvard University.

In 1991, he works in the US Department of Agriculture and Forest Services in the city of Missoula.

In 1994, he became an author of the Intergovernmental Panel on Climate Change (IPCC). In the same year, the first Climate Change Report was published by the IPCC. He was responsible for Rocky Mountain Climate Monitoring.

Until 2014, he has been the author or co-author of more than 70 publications in specialized magazines. His publications are widely cited by major institutions and universities around the world.
