= Alice Chien Chang =

Taiwanese molecular biologist and neuroscientist (1950–2026)

- 錢嘉韻
- Born: Chien Chia-yun; March 14, 1950; Taiwan
- Died: March 2, 2026 (aged 75); Taipei, Taiwan
- Citizenship: Taiwanese
- Education: Fu Jen Catholic University; University of Cincinnati; Iowa State University
- Scientific career
- Fields: Molecular biology, Neuroscience
- Workplaces: East Carolina University; National Yang-Ming Medical College; National Yang-Ming University; National Yang Ming Chiao Tung University
- Academic advisors: Horst Dieter Dellmann

Alice Chien Chang (March 14, 1950 – March 2, 2026) was a Taiwanese molecular biologist and neuroscientist. She taught at National Yang-Ming Medical College, National Yang-Ming University, and National Yang Ming Chiao Tung University. In 1976, she and her collaborators published research on the purification of a DNA polymerase from the extreme thermophile Thermus aquaticus; this work was later regarded as one of the key technical foundations that enabled the high-temperature cycling, automation, and commercialization of the polymerase chain reaction (PCR).

== Background ==
Chien graduated from the Department of Biology at Fu Jen Catholic University in 1972. She later pursued graduate studies in the United States, earning a master's degree in cell biology from the University of Cincinnati and a Ph.D. in molecular, cellular, and developmental biology from Iowa State University. She subsequently conducted postdoctoral research in microbiology at the East Carolina University School of Medicine. After returning to Taiwan in 1982, she joined National Yang-Ming Medical College, where she engaged in teaching and research in neuroscience for many years.

During her tenure within the Yang-Ming academic system, she served as director of the Institute of Neuroscience, director of the Neuroscience Research Center, and university librarian, before retiring in 2013.

Alice Chien was married to Chang Nan-chi. She died on March 2, 2026, at the age of 75.

== Contributions to PCR ==
In 1976, under the name Alice Chien, Chien co-authored the paper "Deoxyribonucleic acid polymerase from the extreme thermophile Thermus aquaticus" with David B. Edgar and John M. Trela in the Journal of Bacteriology. The study reported the purification of a stable DNA polymerase from Thermus aquaticus, a thermophilic bacterium, and found that the enzyme had an optimal reaction temperature of approximately 80 °C.

When the polymerase chain reaction (PCR) was first developed in the mid-1980s, it still relied on the Klenow fragment of Escherichia coli DNA polymerase I, which was not thermostable. Because each cycle required high-temperature denaturation, the polymerase would become inactivated and had to be replenished after every round, making the procedure cumbersome and prone to error. In his 1993 Nobel Prize lecture, Kary Mullis recalled that one of the major difficulties of early PCR was the need to add fresh heat-sensitive polymerase after each cycle of temperature change.

In 1988, Randall K. Saiki and colleagues introduced the thermostable DNA polymerase from T. aquaticus into PCR, noting that this change "greatly simplified" the procedure. Because the reaction could be carried out at higher temperatures, it also significantly improved specificity, yield, sensitivity, and the length of DNA fragments that could be amplified. Later review literature likewise noted that the introduction of thermostable polymerase eliminated the need to add fresh enzyme in every cycle and made automated PCR on thermal cyclers possible, thereby constituting a crucial step in the transformation of PCR from a conceptual method into a widely applied technology.

== Recognition and patent litigation related to PCR ==
In 1993, the Nobel Prize in Chemistry was awarded to Kary Mullis for the invention of the polymerase chain reaction (PCR) method. However, the official prize citation did not address the contributors involved in the earlier isolation and purification of Taq DNA polymerase. In terms of the technology's developmental trajectory, Chien's 1976 study was directly connected to the 1988 introduction of thermostable polymerase into PCR, and it has therefore often been regarded in later historical reviews of PCR as an important part of the prehistory that made the technique practically viable.

In patent litigation concerning Taq polymerase during the 1990s and early 2000s, court documents also identified the 1976 paper by Chien and her co-authors as relevant prior art, further underscoring the study's early and foundational place in the history of Taq technology.

== Selected publications ==
- Chien, Alice; Edgar, David B.; Trela, John M. (September 1976). "Deoxyribonucleic acid polymerase from the extreme thermophile Thermus aquaticus". Journal of Bacteriology. 127 (3): 1550–1557. doi:10.1128/jb.127.3.1550-1557.1976. PMC 232952. PMID 8432.

== See also ==
- List of Fu Jen Catholic University alumni
- Index of women scientists articles
