= Sung-lan Hsia =

American dermatologist

- 夏松瀾
- Born: China
- Died: September 17, 2010; Miami, Florida, United States
- Education: Fu Jen Catholic University; St. Louis University
- Scientific career
- Fields: Dermatology; Cutaneous
- Workplaces: University of Miami

Sung-lan Hsia (Chinese: 夏松瀾, ? – 17 September 2010) was a professor of dermatology and cutaneous surgery for 43 years at the University of Miami.

== Biography ==
Hsia was born in China. After graduating from Department of Chemistry of Fu Jen Catholic University in 1944, he was admitted to Chinese Ministry of Education for a scholarship for studying abroad two years later and went to St. Louis University to obtain a doctorate.

Hsia laid an important foundation for the skin treatment drug development industry. He is an expert in high-density lipoprotein cholesterol research and discovered the important role of coenzyme Q10 (CoQ10) in cancer suppression. In more than 40 years of academic career, Hsia has published nearly 100 papers, 12 books and many patents, approximately 15 that were approved, and has supervised dozens of PhD degrees. Based on these works, he received funding from the National Institutes of Health and the Wallace Research Foundation.

He was the most active Catholic in the Miami area and is also committed to participating in the Catholic Church of Chinese immigrants.
