= Tsai Sheng-pang =

Taiwanese politician

Tsai Sheng-pang (Chinese: 蔡勝邦; born 23 October 1946) is a Taiwanese politician. He was a member of the Legislative Yuan from 1981 to 1996, then took office from 1996 to 1999 as an alternate legislator. He was also a member of the third National Assembly.

Tsai studied law at National Taiwan University. For much of his political career, Tsai was an independent. He joined the Kuomintang to represent the party in the 1993 Taipei County magisterial election, and lost to You Ching.
