= Trend Micro =

American-Japanese multinational cyber security company

Trend Micro Inc. トレンドマイクロ株式会社
- Type: Public (K.K.)
- Traded as: TYO: 4704
- Industry: Computer software
- Founded: 24 October 1988; 38 years ago, Los Angeles, California, U.S.
- Founder: Eva Chen; Steve Chang; Jenny Chang
- Headquarters: Tokyo, Japan (global); Irving, Texas, United States (global operational); Taipei, Taiwan (global R&D)
- Area served: Worldwide
- Key people: Steve Chang (Chairman); Eva Chen (CEO)
- Products: Cybersecurity software
- Services: Computer security
- Revenue: ▲¥223.8 billion (2022)
- Operating income: ▼¥31.3 billion (2022)
- Net income: ▼¥29.8 billion (2022)
- Total assets: ▲¥470.8 billion (2022)
- Total equity: ▲¥228.7 billion (2022)
- Number of employees: 7,000 (2022)
- Website: www.trendmicro.com

Trend Micro Inc. (トレンドマイクロ株式会社, Torendo Maikuro Kabushiki-Gaisha) is an American-Japanese cyber security software company. The company has globally dispersed R&D in 16 locations across every continent excluding Antarctica. The company develops enterprise security software for servers, containers, and cloud computing environments, networks, and end points. Its cloud and virtualization security products provide automated security for customers of VMware, Amazon AWS, Microsoft Azure, and Google Cloud Platform.

Eva Chen is a co-founder, and chief executive officer since 2005. She succeeded founding CEO Steve Chang, who now is chairman.

== Corporate history ==
=== 1988–1999 ===
The company was founded in 1988 in Los Angeles by Steve Chang, his wife, Jenny Chang, and her sister, Eva Chen (陳怡樺). The company was established with proceeds from Steve Chang's previous sale of a copy protection dongle to a United States–based Rainbow Technologies. Shortly after establishing the company, its founders moved headquarters to Taipei.

In 1992, Trend Micro took over a Japanese software firm to form Trend Micro Devices and established headquarters in Tokyo. It then made an agreement with CPU maker Intel, under which it produced an anti-virus product for local area networks (LANs) for sale under the Intel brand. Intel paid royalties to Trend Micro for sales of LANDesk Virus Protect in the United States and Europe, while Trend paid royalties to Intel for sales in Asia. In 1993, Novell began bundling the product with its network operating system. In 1996, the two companies agreed to a two-year continuation of the agreement in which Trend was allowed to globally market the ServerProtect product under its own brand alongside Intel's LANDesk brand.

Trend Micro was listed on the Tokyo Stock Exchange in 1998 under the ticker 4704. The company began trading on the United States–based NASDAQ stock exchange in July 1999.

=== 2000s ===
In 2004, founding chief executive officer Steve Chang decided to split the responsibilities of CEO and chairman of the company. Company co-founder Eva Chen succeeded Chang as chief executive officer of Trend Micro in January 2005. Chen has been the company's chief technology officer since 1996 and before that executive vice president since the company's founding in October 1989. Chang retained his position as company chairman. In May, Trend Micro acquired US-based antispyware company InterMute for $15 million. Trend Micro had fully integrated InterMute's SpySubtract antispyware program into its antispyware product offerings by the end of that year.

In June 2005 Trend Micro acquired Kelkea, a US-based developer of antispam software. Kelkea developed Mail Abuse Prevention System (MAPS) and IP filtering software that allowed internet service providers to block spam and phishing scams. Kelkea chief executive officer Dave Rand was retained by Trend Micro as its chief technologist for content security.

In March 2007, Trend Micro acquired freeware antispyware program HijackThis from its creator Merijn Bellekom for an undisclosed sum. Trend Micro delisted its depository shares from the NASDAQ stock exchange in May. Later that year, in October, Trend Micro acquired US-based data loss prevention software developer Provilla. Provilla was the creator of LeakProof, software that allowed companies to block the transmission of sensitive data and warn security managers about transmission attempts.

Trend Micro acquired Identum in February 2008 for an undisclosed sum. Identum, which was founded in and later spun-off from the University of Bristol cryptography department, developed ID-based email encryption software. Identum's chairman was serial entrepreneur, Steve Purdham. The two companies were originally in talks for Trend Micro to license Identum's technology, but Trend Micro later decided to purchase the firm outright. Identum was renamed Trend Micro (Bristol) and its encryption technology was integrated into existing Trend Micro products. Existing Identum products were continued but sold under the Trend Micro brand. Also that year, Trend Micro sued Barracuda Networks for the latter's distribution of ClamAV as part of a security package. Trend Micro claimed that Barracuda's use of ClamAV infringed on a software patent owned by Trend Micro for filtering viruses on an Internet gateway. On 19 May 2011, the U.S. Patent and Trademark Office issued a Final Rejection in the reexamination of Trend Micro's U.S. patent 5,623,600.

In April 2009, Trend Micro acquired Ottawa, Canada–based Third Brigade for an undisclosed sum. Third Brigade developed host-based intrusion prevention and firewall software that had been used by Trend Micro in its Trend OfficeScan anti-malware suite for two years prior to acquiring Third Brigade. Third Brigade was reincorporated as Trend Micro Canada Technologies.

=== 2010-2017 ===
Trend Micro acquired UK-based humyo in June 2010 for an undisclosed sum. humyo provided cloud-based data storage and synchronization services to small businesses and individuals. Later that year, in November, Trend Micro acquired Mobile Armor. Mobile Armor was a developer of full disk, file and folder, and removable media encryption for mobile devices. Trend Micro integrated the company's technology into a centrally-managed platform for mobile device security.

In June 2012, Trend Micro acquired US-based Secure Sockets Layer (SSL) certificate provider AffirmTrust, followed by the acquisition of Taiwanese advanced network-security firm Broadweb in October 2012. Broadweb was a developer of deep packet inspection technology that had the ability to block malicious data packets in real-time. The technology was integrated into Trend Micro's Custom Defense Solution, a suite that was designed to provide network-wide visibility and protection against advanced attacks and threats. As of 2013, Trend Micro received its threat intelligence from TrendLabs, the company's research, development, and support center. TrendLabs at the time had ten labs worldwide, and was headquartered in the Philippines and employed 1,200 security experts and engineers. Trend Micro's Singapore-based lab at the time provided malware forensics and analysis. Trend Micro relocated its US headquarters to the Las Colinas area of Irving, Texas in September 2013. The relocation allowed the company to consolidate operations previously housed in Cupertino, California and Arlington, Texas.

In October 2015, Trend Micro agreed to buy TippingPoint, a network and software security developer from HP Inc. for $US300 million. This included the bug bounty program the Zero Day Initiative, which was incorporated in Trend Micro Research's focus on existing threats, vulnerabilities, and future potential security issues. Also in 2015, Trend Micro was certified as a VCE validation ready solution and Vblock ready through the VCE Technology Alliance Partner program. Later, Trend Micro joined the VCE Select Program, which allowed Trend Micro's Deep Security to be bundled with VCE's converged and hyper-converged infrastructure systems.

Trend Micro launched a $US100 million venture capital investment fund in June 2017, which was focused on the next generation of technology including the Internet of Things (IoT). In September 2017, Trend Micro was awarded reimbursement through the U.S. District Court for a portion of the legal fees incurred over rejected patent claims filed by Intellectual Ventures.

In November 2017, Trend Micro acquired IMMUNIO, adding new capabilities for hybrid cloud security that fit neatly into the DevOps life cycle. IMMUNIO introduced early detection and protection against application vulnerabilities and container image scanning allowing for the publishing and protection of secure container images.

In December 2017, Trend partnered with Telco Systems to develop a virtual network cybersecurity platform combining Trend's Virtual Network Function Suite with Telco's NFVTime software.

=== 2018-2019 ===
The company in early 2018 launched Trend Forward Capital. The venture's initial investments included business-to-business payment company Veem, wearable device company Muse, telemetry company Mojio and brain health technology company Interaxon. In February 2018, Trend Micro partnered with Panasonic to build more secure systems for electronic control units in automated cars. Trend Micro's early 2018 report on EU's General Data Protection Regulation showed an increase in extortion attempts as organizations try to comply with EU privacy laws.

In August 2018, researchers discovered that several Trend Micro consumer products for MacOS were capturing browser history and other data, including passwords, and sending it to a remote server for initial analysis designed to enhance security. The products identified were Dr. Cleaner, Dr. Cleaner Pro, Dr. Antivirus, Dr. Unarchiver, Dr. Battery, Duplicate Finder and Open Any File. As a consequence, Apple removed the Trend Micro products from its Mac App Store. Trend Micro admitted that the products had captured and uploaded the data. It also apologized to its "community for concern they might have felt", but went on to excuse the activity as being "humbly the result of the use of common code libraries", and that, in any event, appropriation of users' data was "explicitly disclosed in the applicable EULAs".

In September 2018 Trend Micro and HITRUST announced a partnership to launch a new center which provides advanced cyber risk management. In November 2018 Trend Micro and Moxa Inc. formed a joint-venture corporation, TXOne Networks, which focused on security needs in the Industrial Internet of Things (IoT) environments.

It partnered with Luxoft Holding, Inc. in April 2019 to jointly introduce and deploy the Intrusion Detection System (IDS) and Intrusion Prevention Systems (IPS) to secure networked vehicles from cyberattacks. In October 2019, Trend Micro partnered with Snyk to create a solution for open source vulnerabilities. Additionally, that month, Trend Micro acquired Cloud Conformity, a Cloud Security Posture Management company. In October 2021, Trend Micro partnered with Fujitsu Limited and automotive-related manufacturers to strengthen connected car security measures.

=== 2020s ===
In January 2023, Trend Micro established CTOne, a new subsidiary focused on advancing 5G network security. In February, Trend Micro acquired Anylz, a provider of security operations center technology. In April, Trend Micro announced the Risk to Resilience World Tour which covered over 120 cities in 90 days, with the mission of helping organizations come together and mitigate cyber risk.

In October 2024, Trend Micro remained headquartered in Tokyo, and had a market cap of US$7.92 billion. Trend Micro opened a new hub in Barcelona in the summer of 2025. At the time, it had 7500 employees overall.

In March 2026, Eva Chen remained Trend Micro CEO. That month, Trend Micro Incorporated rebranded its enterprise cybersecurity business as TrendAI. Trend Micro also bundled its security products into one enterprise platform, TrendAI Vision One. At the time, the unit had 575,000 enterprise customers, and the unit had 6,000 employees. TrendAI operated in 185 countries, and had 14 research and development centers.

In April 2026, Trend Micro rebranded its consumer business as TrendLife, a consumer-focused brand centered on AI-powered digital safety, privacy and lifestyle services.

Also in April 2026, Trend Micro announced it was expanding data centers in South Africa. Also that month, the TrendAI unit began partnering with Anthropic.

On June 4, 2026, Trend Micro announced it had been granted access to Anthropic's newest AI model, Claude Mythos Preview.

In August 2026, TrendLife launched Kaleida, a family-focused AI service that provides individual AI profiles for family members and includes privacy, security, and parental learning features.

== Police and security partnerships ==
In September 2014, Trend Micro began a partnership with INTERPOL wherein Trend Micro shared with the international police organization information on cybercrime threats via the company's Threat Intelligence Service. According to INTERPOL, the information helped the international police organization and its 190 member countries decrease cybercrime on a global scale. Trend Micro also provided a cybercrime investigation training program to INTERPOL.

In April 2018, Trend Micro joined the Cybersecurity Tech Accord, a public agreement between companies to defend all customers from malicious attacks by cybercriminal gangs and nation states.

In March 2019, Trend Micro announced a partnership to share threat information with The Japanese Center of Incident Readiness and Strategy for Cybersecurity (NISC).

In October 2022, Trend Micro formed a U.S. Federal Excellence Committee staffed by six current U.S. government officials to facilitate collaboration among federal agencies regarding cybersecurity threats.

Trend Micro in June 2026 joined Anthropic's Project Glasswing, an initiative aiming to use Mythos to counter cyberattacks.

== Technologies ==
In March 2026, Trend Micro bundled its security products into a single enterprise platform, TrendAI Vision One.

=== History of platform features ===
In June 2008, Trend Micro introduced Trend Micro Smart Protection Network, a cloud-client content security infrastructure that delivers global threat intelligence to protect customers from online threats, such as data stealing malware, phishing attacks, and other web, email, and mobile threats. In 2012, Trend Micro added big data analytics to its Smart Protection Network. Big data analytics allow the network to use behavioral-based identification methods to identify new security threats. The network as of 2008 also combined in-the-cloud technologies with other client-based antivirus technologies to reduce dependency on conventional pattern file downloads on the endpoint. As of 2012, threat information from Trend Micro's Smart Protection Network was deployed in real time to the company's security software portfolio.

In 2014, Trend Micro expanded its Cloud App Security to protect Microsoft Office 365 from threats not caught by native Microsoft Security. By 2016, the Cloud App Security software was expanded to cover Box, Dropbox and Google Drive. In April 2018, the company released a tool that helps identify individual writing styles and combat email fraud.

In October 2018, Trend Micro launched Apex One Endpoint Security, a single agent Endpoint Security product, stemming from the company's past endpoint security products. In July 2019, Trend Micro expanded its presence on Microsoft Azure with Deep Security as a Service. In August, Trend Micro expanded its XDR service offering across email, network, server, and cloud workloads.

In November 2019, Trend Micro announced its new product offering, Cloud One, a suite of security products for organizations building platforms in the cloud. Trend Micro launched the suite with the release of Cloud One – Workload Security. In July 2020, Trend Micro Launched Cloud One – Conformity, a product resulting from the company's purchase of Cloud Conformity, to help organizations tackle misconfigurations, compliance challenges, and cyber-risks in the cloud. In November 2020, Trend Micro released Cloud One – Network Security, intended to protect private cloud networks. Additionally, Trend Micro announced a cloud security integration with AWS Gateway Load Balancer, to make it easier for corporations to implement and manage third party virtual appliances. Trend Micro was also named a launch partner for AWS Firewall, a managed service that deploys essential network protections for Amazon Virtual Private Clouds on Amazon Web Services. Trend Micro also launched Trend Micro Check, a free tool for identifying fraud and misinformation in the U.S. In December 2020, Trend Micro expanded its Cloud One suite of products with Cloud One – File Storage Security.

In January 2021, Trend Micro Launched Cloud One – Container Security. In February, Trend Micro launched Vision One, an XDR platform that allowed customers to both detect and respond to threats from a single platform. In May 2021, Trend Micro announced TXOne StellarProtect, and OT-native endpoint security solution. Trend Micro also launched Cloud One – Open Source Security by Snyk, the result of a multi-year partnership between the two companies.

In September 2021, Trend Micro launched Service One, a service to allow customers to get support from industry professionals in managing their security.

In April 2022, Trend Micro announced Trend Micro One, a platform in which Trend Micro and its ecosystem partners provide customers connected visibility, better detection and response, and protection across all security layers. In June 2022, Trend Micro announced VicOne, a dedicated security offering for electric vehicles and connected cars. In July 2023, Trend Micro launched Trend Vision One, with a GPT based cybersecurity assistant, Companion, as part of its XDR product offering.

In February 2025, it continued to sell its Trend Micro Internet Security security suite, with features like AI-based filtering on newly created sites, and AI detection to find phishing scams.

== Hacking events ==
In 2025, Trend Micro continued to organize international hacking competitions, with cash bounties offered for bugs found in popular software. In May 2025, the event offered a $100,000 prize for zero-day exploits directed at SharePoint.

== Sponsorship ==
In July 2023, Trend Micro signed a deal with McLaren Formula E Team as an official partner from 2024 onwards. After McLaren bowed out of Formula E in 2025, Trend Micro signed a partnership deal with McLaren Formula One Team.

== Irresponsible Vulnerability Disclosure ==
On October 21st 2026, Trend Micro's Zero Day Initiative disclosed 6 security vulnerabilities on the public Linux Kernel Mailing List without patches, in complete disregard to well established policy that security vulnerabilities should be sent to the Linux Kernel Security Team, as well as their own security policy. This disclosure comes at the same time as multiple bugs and vulnerabilities have been disclosed in what is being called Black October. 2 of these vulnerabilities have a 9.0 CVSS rating.

== See also ==
- Antivirus software
- Cloud security
- Computer security
