= Black October =

Black October may refer to:

- The October 1993 attack by the Yeltsin administration on mass demonstrations, leading to the 1993 Russian constitutional crisis.
- Black October (Algeria), October 1988 in Algeria
- The October Crisis, a 1970 kidnapping/terrorism crisis in Canada
- Black October (film), a 2000 film about the October Crisis
- Black October (album), 2006 Sadat X album
- "Octubre negro", unrest in Bolivia in October 2003 during the Bolivian gas conflict
- October 2008, the peak of the 2008 financial crisis
- 2013 New South Wales bushfires in Australia
- The Black October organization that claimed responsibility for the assassination of Maryland state delegate Turk Scott
- Black October (information security), October 2026 with high number of information security incidents
