= Moxa Technologies =

Taiwanese technology company

- Type: Private Company
- Industry: Technology
- Founded: 1987
- Headquarters: Taipei, Taiwan
- Key people: JE Hsu (CEO)
- Number of employees: 1900 (2025)
- Website: moxa.com

Moxa Technologies is a Taiwanese technology company headquartered in Taipei, Taiwan, specializing in edge computing, industrial automation, and network infrastructure.

== History ==
In 2005, Moxa sponsored an international contest to discover novel applications of wireless device servers.

By 2005, Moxa was a $30 million company and by 2008, Moxa's valuation reached $100 million.

In November 2018, Moxa and Trend Micro announced the formation of a joint-venture corporation named TXOne Networks which will focus on security needs of Industrial Internet of Things (IoT) networks.

In 2019, Moxa teamed up with National Taiwan University to launch a research and development lab called MOXA-NTU Networking Innovation Lab, primarily focusing on Time-Sensitive Networking.

After USA, Germany, India (2011) and China Moxa founded a branch in Tokyo in 2020. In South Korea is a branch, too.

== Moxa Americas Inc. ==
Moxa Americas Inc. is Moxa’s American subsidiary, founded in 1992 and headquartered in Brea, CA. Moxa Americas Inc. employs approximately 800 people as of 2019.

== See also ==
- List of companies of Taiwan
