= Kuo-chu Ho =

Chinese professor of Nuclear Physics

- 何国柱
- Born: 13 November 1922; Beijing, China
- Died: 9 October 2017 (aged 94); Castro Valley, California, United States
- Education: Fu Jen Catholic University; University of Notre Dame
- Scientific career
- Fields: Nuclear physicist
- Workplaces: University of Chicago; University of Florida. Nankai University

Kuo-chu Ho (Chinese: 何国柱, 13 November 1922 – 9 October 2017) was a Chinese professor of nuclear physics, known as one of the founders of theoretical physics in Nankai University.

== Biography ==
In 1945, Ho graduated from Fu Jen Catholic University with a bachelor's degree, and he obtained a doctorate in physics from the University of Notre Dame in 1951. He has served as a physicist the Enrico Fermi Institute at the University of Chicago and a professor at University of Florida.

He returned to China in 1955 and successively served as a professor and chairman of the Department of Physics of Nankai University. He also served as the first chairman of the Tianjin Branch of the Chinese Nuclear Society and the first, second, and third vice-chairmen of the Tianjin Physical Society. He is also a member of China Association for Promoting Democracy.

He led the design and manufacture of China's first 2 million volts electronic, electrostatic accelerator and also introduced a 1.6 million volt tandem heavy ion electrostatic accelerator from the United States, which has made extraordinary contributions to the development of Nankai University.

Ho's main research areas are nuclear theory and astrophysics, and he is outstanding at theoretical calculation and simulation of nuclear physics.
