= Moxa, Thuringia =

Moxa
- Municipality
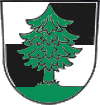
- Coat of arms

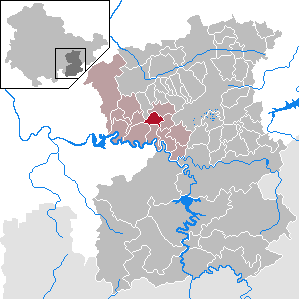
- Location of Moxa within Saale-Orla-Kreis district
- Interactive map of Moxa
- Location within Germany Location within Thuringia
- Coordinates: 50°38′28″N 11°37′47″E
- Country: Germany
- State: Thuringia
- District: Saale-Orla-Kreis
- Municipal assoc.: Ranis-Ziegenrück

Government
  - Mayor (2023–29): Johannes Linke

Area
  - Total: 4.72 km^{2} (1.82 sq mi)
- Elevation: 430 m (1,410 ft)

Population (2025-12-31)
  - Total: 81
  - Density: 17/km^{2} (44/sq mi)
- Time zone: UTC+01:00 (CET)
  - Summer (DST): UTC+02:00 (CEST)
- Postal codes: 07381
- Dialling codes: 036483
- Vehicle registration: SOK
- Website: www.vg-ranis-ziegenrueck.de

The municipality of Moxa (German pronunciation: [ˈmɔksa]) forms part of the Saale-Orla district in Thuringia, Germany.
