= Schmorda =

- Municipality
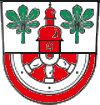
- Coat of arms

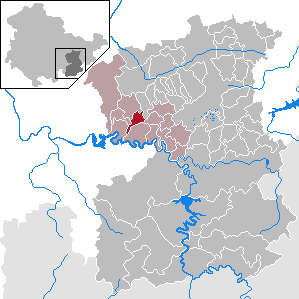
- Location of Schmorda within Saale-Orla-Kreis district
- Interactive map of Schmorda
- Location within Germany Location within Thuringia
- Coordinates: 50°38′41″N 11°35′10″E
- Country: Germany
- State: Thuringia
- District: Saale-Orla-Kreis
- Municipal assoc.: Ranis-Ziegenrück

Government
  - Mayor (2022–28): Andrea Philipp-Dittrich

Area
  - Total: 4.84 km^{2} (1.87 sq mi)
- Elevation: 510 m (1,670 ft)

Population (2025-12-31)
  - Total: 87
  - Density: 18/km^{2} (47/sq mi)
- Time zone: UTC+01:00 (CET)
  - Summer (DST): UTC+02:00 (CEST)
- Postal codes: 07389
- Dialling codes: 03647
- Vehicle registration: SOK
- Website: www.vg-ranis-ziegenrueck.de

Schmorda is a municipality in the district Saale-Orla-Kreis, in Thuringia, Germany. The area is located in the south central portion of the county, and has, as of late 2008, a population of eighty-six residents.
