= Esther H. Chang =

American medical scientist

- 張惠平
- Education: Fu Jen Catholic University; Southern Illinois University
- Scientific career
- Fields: Nanomedicine
- Workplaces: National Institutes of Health; National Cancer Institute; Stanford University; Georgetown University; National Cancer Institute; NASA; Department of Energy

Esther Hui-ping Chang (Chinese: 張惠平) is an American medical scientist, Professor of Georgetown University, founding scientist and senior consultant for SynerGene Therapeutics, Inc.

== Biography ==
Esther Chang received her bachelor's degree from Department of Biology of Fu Jen Catholic University in Taiwan and Ph.D. from Southern Illinois University. She has served in the National Institutes of Health, the National Cancer Institute (NCI), the Uniformed Services University of the Health Sciences and the Stanford University Medical Center.

Chang joined Georgetown Lombard Comprehensive Cancer Center in 1996 as a professor of oncology and otolaryngology.

== Contributions ==
Esther Chang's innovative target delivery nano-cancer treatment method minimizes the toxicity of therapeutic agents to normal cells. In other words, in the process of cancer treatment, nanotherapy not only caused no serious side effects, but also produced excellent curative effects. The new treatment passed the first phase of clinical trials in the United States in 2014 and was approved by the US Food and Drug Administration (FDA) to enter the second phase of human clinical trials.

== Recognition ==
- 1999 - Outstanding Alumni Award of Fu Jen Catholic University
- 2014 - American Society for Nanomedicine Lifetime Achievement Award
