= Saale-Rennsteig =

Coordinates: 50.433°N 11.667°E

Saale-Rennsteig is a former Verwaltungsgemeinschaft ("collective municipality") in the district Saale-Orla-Kreis, in Thuringia, Germany. The seat of the Verwaltungsgemeinschaft was in Blankenstein. It was disbanded in January 2019.

The Verwaltungsgemeinschaft Saale-Rennsteig consisted of the following municipalities:

1. Birkenhügel
2. Blankenberg
3. Blankenstein
4. Harra
5. Neundorf bei Lobenstein
6. Pottiga
7. Schlegel
