= Robert Michaelis von Olshausen =

German obstetrician and gynecologist (1835–1915)

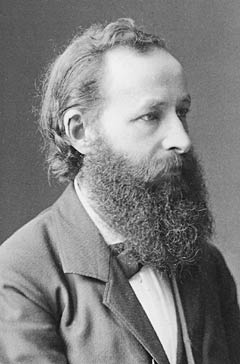
Robert Michaelis von Olshausen

Robert Michaelis von Olshausen (3 July 1835 – 1 February 1915) was a German obstetrician and gynecologist. He was born in Kiel and died in Berlin. He was the son of Justus Olshausen (1800–82), a professor of Oriental languages at the University of Kiel.

== Biography ==
In 1857 he obtained his doctorate from Königsberg, and afterwards served as an assistant to Eduard Arnold Martin in Berlin and to Anton Friedrich Hohl at the University of Halle. In 1863 he became an associate professor at Halle, followed by a full professorship during the following year. In 1887 he returned to Berlin as successor to Karl Ludwig Ernst Schroeder as director of the university Frauenklinik.

He is credited with introducing new obstetrical techniques into surgery. He was publisher of the journal "Zeitschrift für Geburtshilfe und Gynäkologie", and with Johann Veit (1852–1917), he published Karl Schroeder's "Lehrbuch der Geburtshülfe" (from 1888, 10th to 12th editions, the last in 1899 as "Lehrbuch der Geburshülfte").

== Associated eponym ==
- Olshausen's suspension: Suturing the round ligaments and a portion of the broad ligaments of the uterus to the abdominal wall. A surgical procedure for retroversion of the uterus when pregnancy may be expected.

== Selected writings ==
- Krankheiten der Ovarien. In Theodor Billroth’s "Handbuch der Frauenkrankheiten", Stuttgart, 1877. 2nd edition in Theodor Billroth and Georg Albert Lücke, publishers: "Deutsche Chirurgie", Berlin, 1886 – Ovarian diseases
- Ueber ventrale Operation bei Prolapsus und Retroversio uteri. Zentralblatt für Gynäkologie, Leipzig, 1886, 10: 698–701.
- Ueber Exstirpation der Vagina. Zentralblatt für Gynäkologie, Leipzig, 1895, 19: 1–6. – On extirpation of the vagina.
- Lehrbuch der Geburtshilfe. With Johann Veit. 5th edition, Bonn, 1902 – Textbook of obstetrics.
