= Bad Lobenstein =

- Town
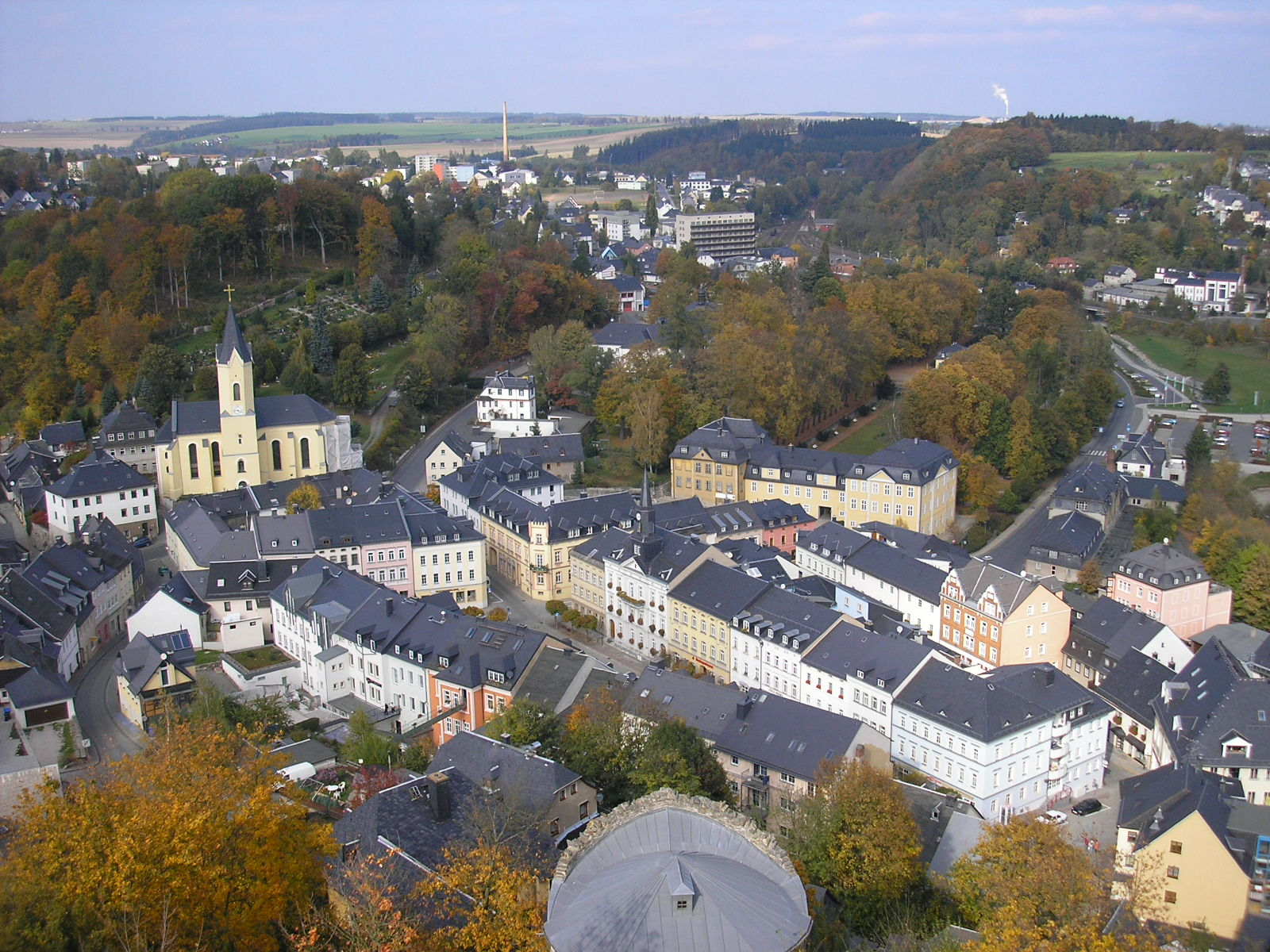
- Old town of Bad Lobenstein

- Coat of arms

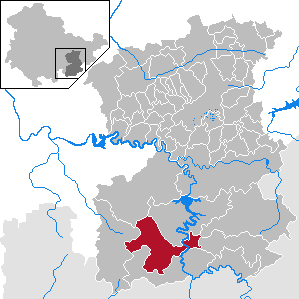
- Location of Bad Lobenstein within Saale-Orla-Kreis district
- Interactive map of Bad Lobenstein
- Location within Germany Location within Thuringia
- Coordinates: 50°27′N 11°39′E
- Country: Germany
- State: Thuringia
- District: Saale-Orla-Kreis
- Subdivisions: 6 Ortsteile

Government
  - Mayor (2024–30): Dominik Kirsten

Area
  - Total: 48.92 km^{2} (18.89 sq mi)
- Elevation: 560 m (1,840 ft)

Population (2025-12-31)
  - Total: 5,523
  - Density: 112.9/km^{2} (292.4/sq mi)
- Time zone: UTC+01:00 (CET)
  - Summer (DST): UTC+02:00 (CEST)
- Postal codes: 07351–07356
- Dialling codes: 036651
- Vehicle registration: SOK
- Website: www.moorbad-lobenstein.de

Bad Lobenstein (German pronunciation: [baːt ˈloːbn̩ˌʃtaɪn]) is a spa town in the Saale-Orla-Kreis district, in Thuringia, Germany with a population of about 6,000 inhabitants. Until 2005, the town was named Lobenstein.

The town, grouped round a rock, upon which stand the ruins of an old castle, is exceedingly picturesque. It contains a spacious parish church, a palace (until 1824 the residence of the princes of Reuss-Lobenstein-Ebersdorf), and a hydropathic establishment. At the beginning of the twentieth century, local industries included dyeing, brewing and cigar-making.

== Etymology ==
Lobenstein could come from "Lobe den Stein" which means "Praise the stone".

A legend describes how the inhabitants believe the town's name might have been established. It is believed that emperor Ludwig the Bavarian, who lived from 1328 to 1347 announced "Praise the stone" as he had lost and found his favourite dog in this region during hunting for deer. He was looking for the dog for quite a while until finally one of his knights found the tired and slightly injured dog lying on a stone. The knight carried the dog to his master, who was so grateful, he gave this piece of land as fief to the knight. In memory of this event, the place received the name Lobenstein and carried from now on the head of a bracke in its coat of arms.

== Geography ==
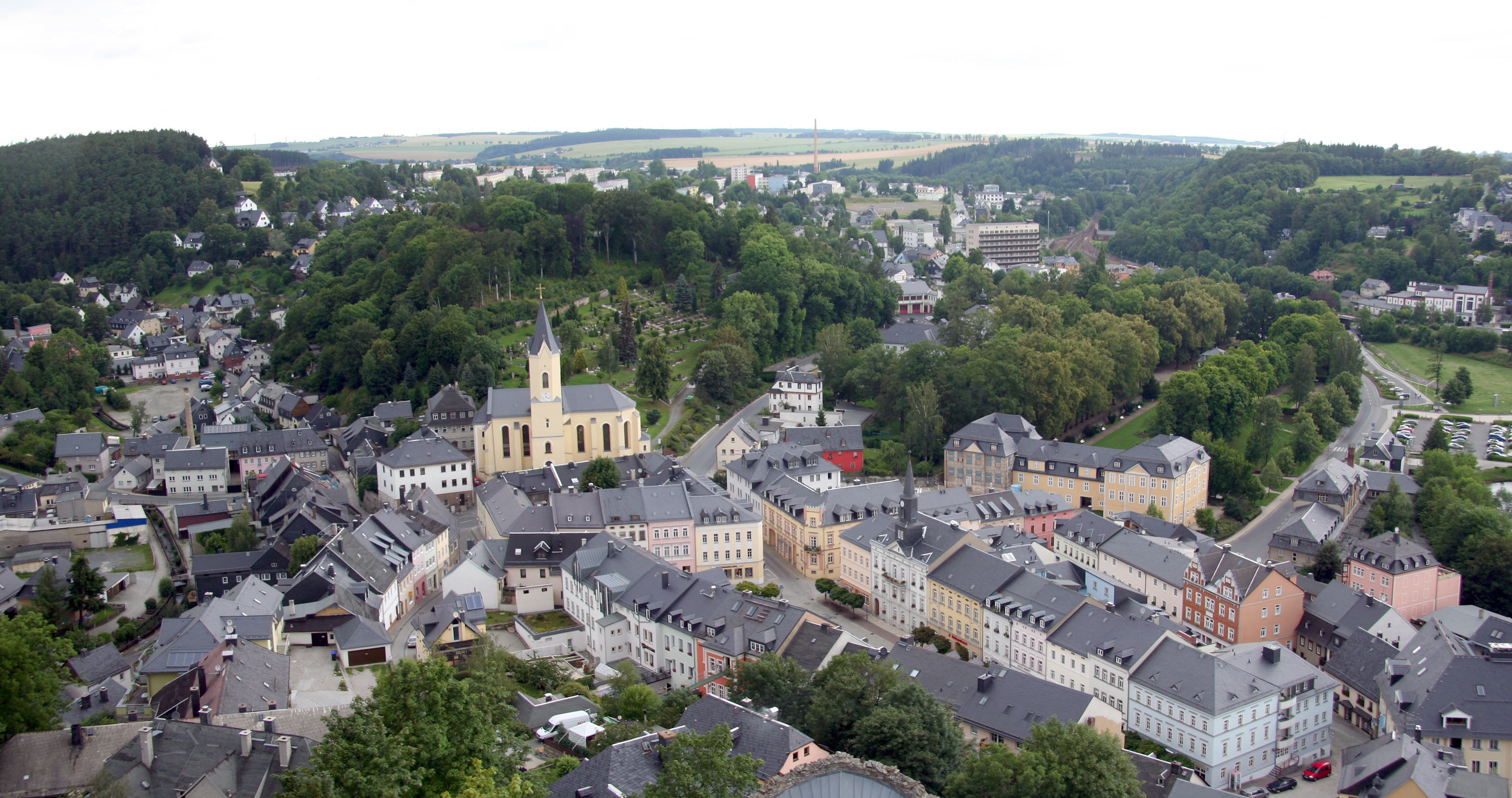
Bad Lobenstein - downtown area with church

The town is located in the Thuringian Highlands between Thuringian Forest and Franconian Forest, south-westerly of the large Saale river dams at Hohenwarte and Bleiloch near Gräfenwarth.

=== Districts ===
- Bad Lobenstein, main district with town center
- Helmsgrün
- Lichtenbrunn
- Mühlberg
- Oberlemnitz
- Saaldorf
- Unterlemnitz

=== Neighbouring communities ===
- Gefell (in Thuringia)
- Saalburg-Ebersdorf
- Tanna
- Wurzbach
- Birkenhügel
- Harra
- Neundorf (bei Lobenstein)
- Remptendorf
- Schlegel

== History ==
The high medieval castle of Lobenstein lies above the center of the town on the right side of the river Lemnitz on a mountain dome. It was used to monitor traffic on the route from Leipzig to Bamberg. Lobenstein was first mentioned in 1250 as the seat of a knight. It was probably a foundation of the Lords of Lobdeburg. An Otto von Lobenstein was mentioned in 1250 at the castle, the first written mention of Lobenstein. In the 13th century, the fortress belonged to the vogts of Gera. From 1597 until 1601 it was the residence of the junior line of the House of Reuss. By 1600 the castle had greatly decayed, and the Reuss then moved to the palace. During the Thirty Years War the castle played a small role, when, in 1632, imperial troops stormed the fortress then occupied by Sweden. Today only the remains of the keep and the fortification wall announce the presence of the castle.

Lobenstein was called already a city by 1278. A Mayor and Council are mentioned in 1411, serving as the lower courts.

On October 8, 1806, the army of Napoleon marched through the city. At 9:00 o'clock Emperor Napoleon I. left Kronach in Bavaria, where he had he visited the fortress and strengthened it with its own and allied Bavarian troops to have a retreat in case of defeat by Prussia. He arrived in Lobenstein around 12:30. His way led over the Gallenberg to Ebersdorf, where he spent the night with 32 generals and staff officers. Day and night Around 190,000 men marched through Lobenstein. The city and the surrounding area were affected. Bivouac and looting were the order of the day. Despite their neutrality the population suffered greatly.

In the new palace was the Marshal and later King of Norway-Sweden Bernadotte. On October 14 the Battle of Jena–Auerstedt was fought, sealing the fate of Prussia.

A citizen of Lobenstein, town clerk Christian Gottlieb Reichard, was known as far as Paris for his extraordinary geographic knowledge. Napoleon invited him to accompany the army as a cartographer. Reichard refused, citing his health, and took to his bed; it is not known Whether he was really ill. From 1597 to 1918, the city belonged to the junior line of the House of Reuss, where, in 1824, it was the residence of the sub-line Reuss-Lobenstein and from then to 1848 to the line Ebersdorf. In 1848, together with Schleiz and Hirschberg, it formed a center of the bourgeois movement.

In 1862 almost all historic buildings were destroyed in a fire. From 1868, healing earth extracted from the nearby high moor and an iron mineral spring brought about the development of a spa in Lobenstein.

The city got railway connections in 1896 to Triptis, in 1901 to Hof, and 1907 to Saalfeld.

During the Second World War 60 women and men from Eastern Europe who were housed in two "Eastern Labor Camps" (Ostarbeiterlagern) had to do forced labor in the metal works of Werner Schröder, in the sawmill, and in the railway maintenance works. In the cemetery of Lobenstein a wooden cross commemorates a concentration camp prisoner who was shot dead by SS men during a death march on the Gallenberg. In the spa park, a memorial with a sculpture "Mourning Mother" by a Polish artist commemorates all victims of fascism of Bad Lobenstein.

Since March 21, 2005, the city officially bears the name "Bad Lobenstein", making it the twelfth spa town in Thuringia. Lobenstein had previously fought for decades for the title of "Bad" ("Spa").

On December 7, 2022, Bad Lobenstein hit the headlines, when the Jagdschloss Waidmannsheil – like other places in eleven German federal states, Italy and Austria – became the scene of one of the largest anti-terror operations in the history of the Federal Republic. In the course of the major raid against the right-wing terrorist network Patriotic Union around Heinrich XIII Prinz Reuss, who was accused by the Public Prosecutor General of Germany of preparing a coup in Germany, the castle was searched.

=== Incorporating communities ===
On 4 August 1993 previously independent municipalities Helmsgrün and Lichtenbrunn got incorporated into the community of Bad Lobenstein. On 1 January 1997 also Unterlemnitz and in 1999 Oberlemnitz got in incorporated.

== Demographics ==
Demographic development (from 1994 on each number was counted on 31 December):

- 1833: 3.274
- 1933: 3.391
- 1939: 3.577
- 1994: 7.002
- 1995: 7.019
- 1996: 7.083
- 1997: 7.455
- 1998: 7.419
- 1999: 7.363
- 2000: 7.332
- 2001: 7.235
- 2002: 7.132
- 2003: 7.042
- 2004: 6.948
- 2005: 6.905
- 2006: 6.820
- 2007: 6.653
- 2008: 6.570
- 2009: 6.466
- 2010: 6.444
- 2011: 6.236
- 2012: 6.164
- 2013: 6.108
- 2014: 6.073
- 2015: 6.146

Data source from 1994: Thuringian State office for Statistics

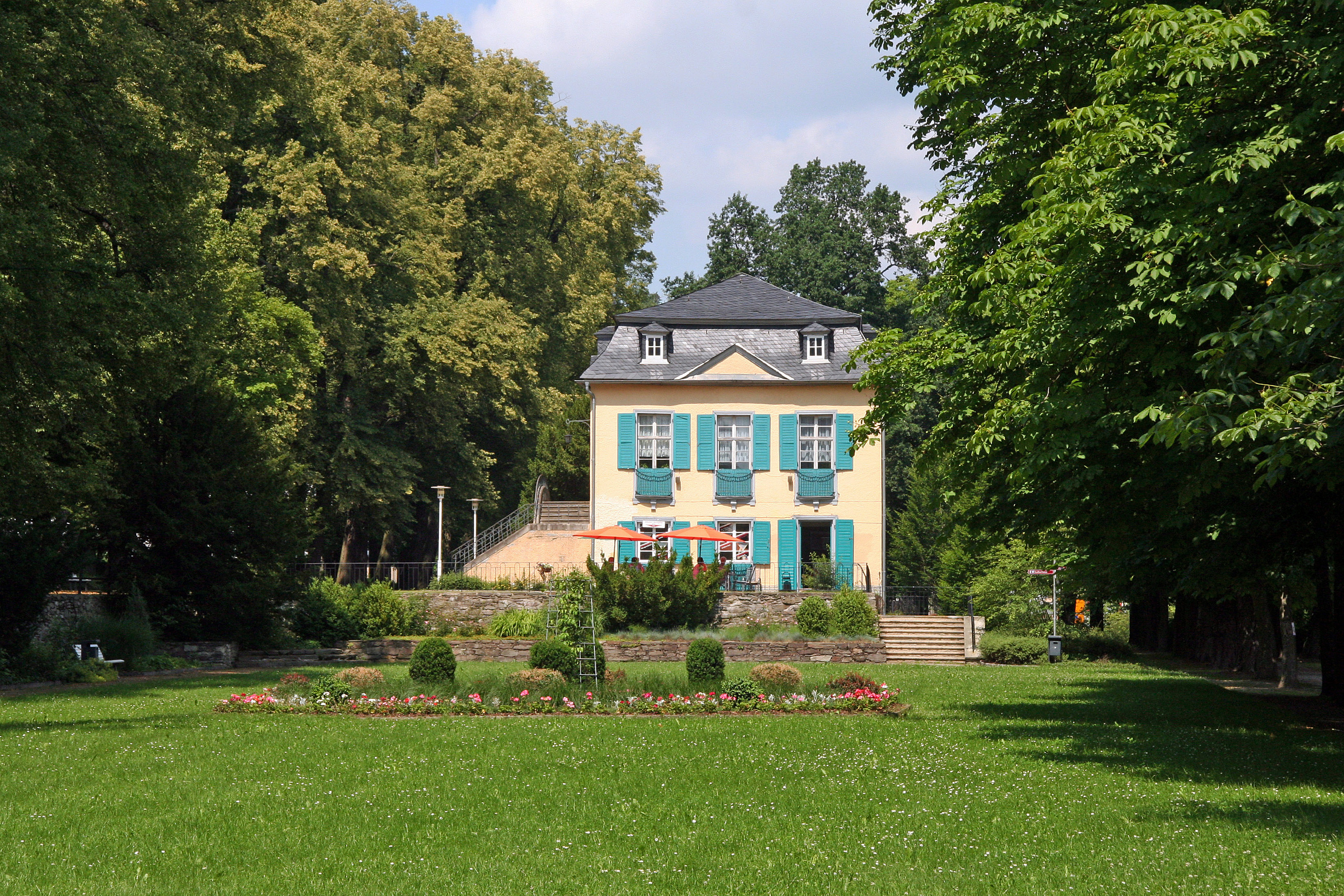
City park, former palace garden

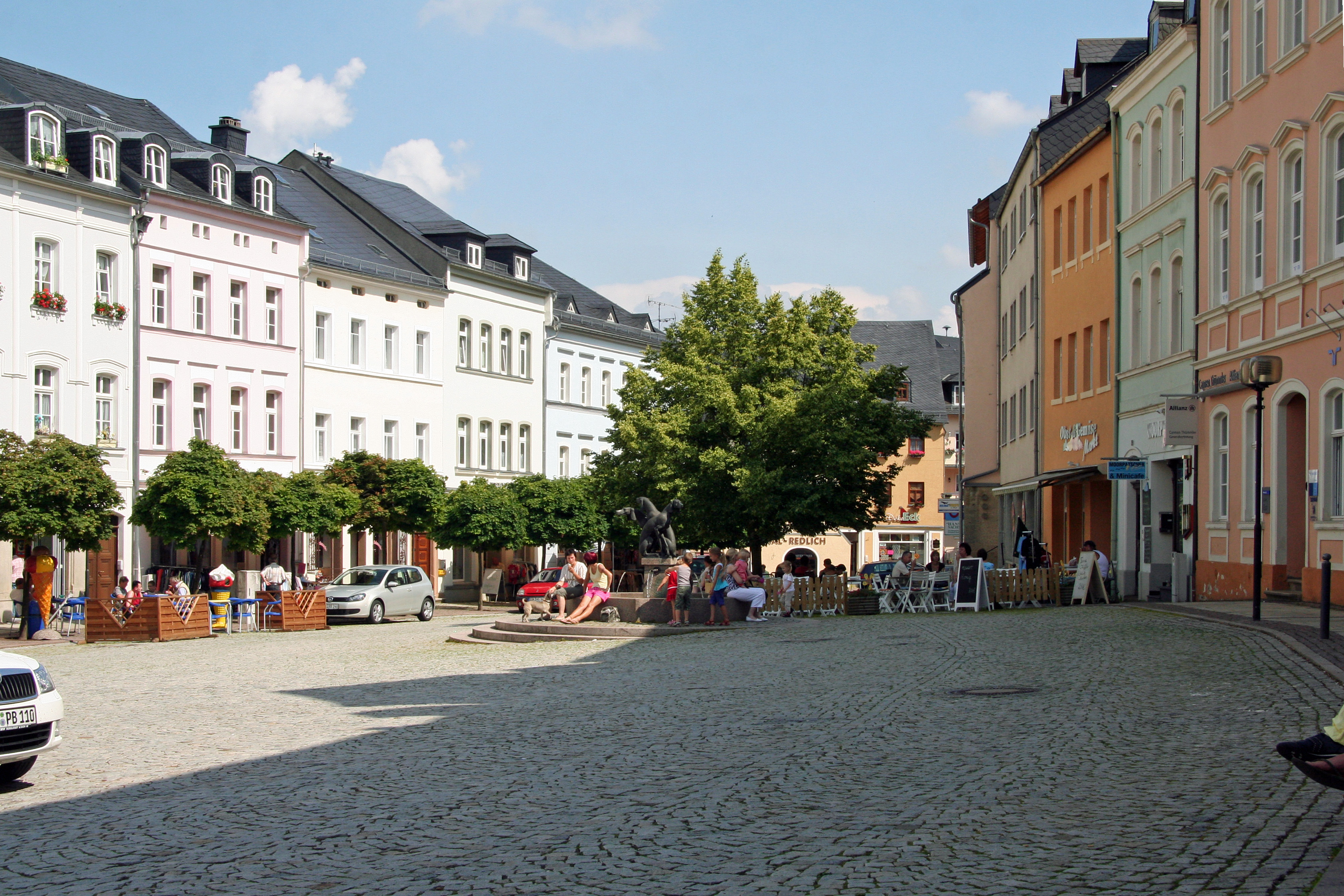
Market place of Bad Lobenstein

== Sights of Bad Lobenstein ==
- New Palace with Palace garden: a baroque complex north of the old town, built between 1714 and 1718. Residence of the princes of Reuß-Lobenstein until 1824. In the garden is a pavilion, built 1746–1748. In front of the palace is the old guardhouse in classical style and the former princely carriage house.

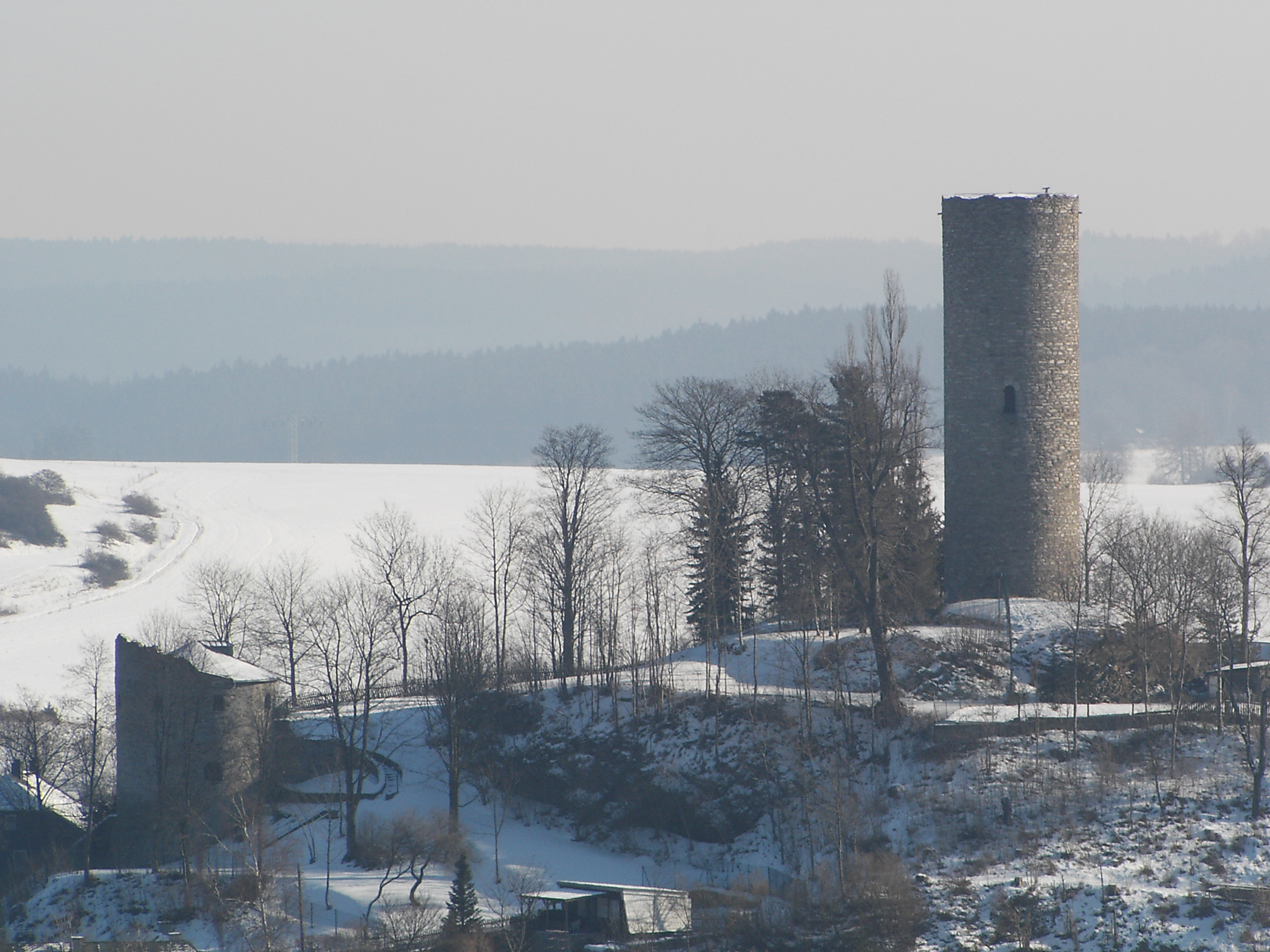
Ruins of Lobenstein Castle

- Ruins of Castle Lobenstein: a castle ruin above the old town. There are two towers, including the 35 metres (115 ft) meter high keep, and some foundations. The complex was built around 1300 by the Lobdeburgers and destroyed during the Thirty Years' War.
- Town's church St. Michaelis: erected after the city fire of 1862.
- Thermal bath: since 2002 spa and moor treatments in the Ardesia-Therme
- "Markt Höhler" - a historical beer cellar which is located in the rocks below the city
- Regional Museum

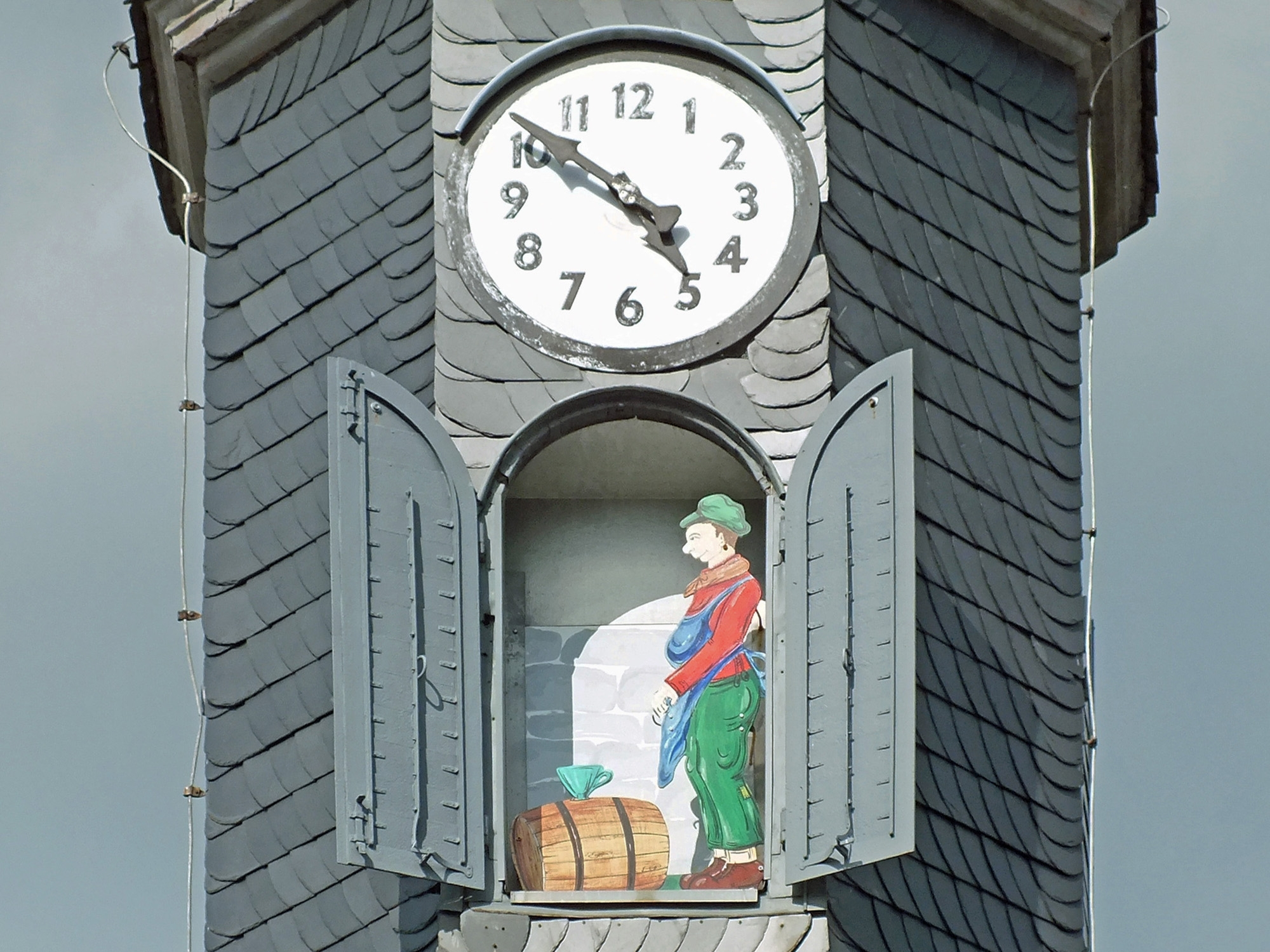
The "Fäßlesächer" in the town hall tower

- "Lommesteener Fäßlesächer" is a small figure located in the town hall tower who seems to urinate through a funnel into a barrel. He is the mascot of Bad Lobenstein. He is hidden behind two doors and is visible several times a day. This figure reflects the nickname of the Lobensteiner, who as economical craft weaver in the 19th century collected the ammonia to produce the finish of the cloth from human urine. Several times a day the figure splashes directly on the marketplace.
- Market place of Bad Lobenstein

== Coat of arms ==
Blazon: "In red floating the silver-black divided trunk of a bracke"

The trunk of the bracke (a certain type of dog group) is the crest of Principality of Reuss-Greiz (German: Fürstentum Reuß-Greiz). The image was already used in the 15th century as coat of arms for the town.

== Notable residents ==
=== Sons and daughters of the town ===
- Bad Lobenstein was the residence of the princes of Reuss-Lobenstein

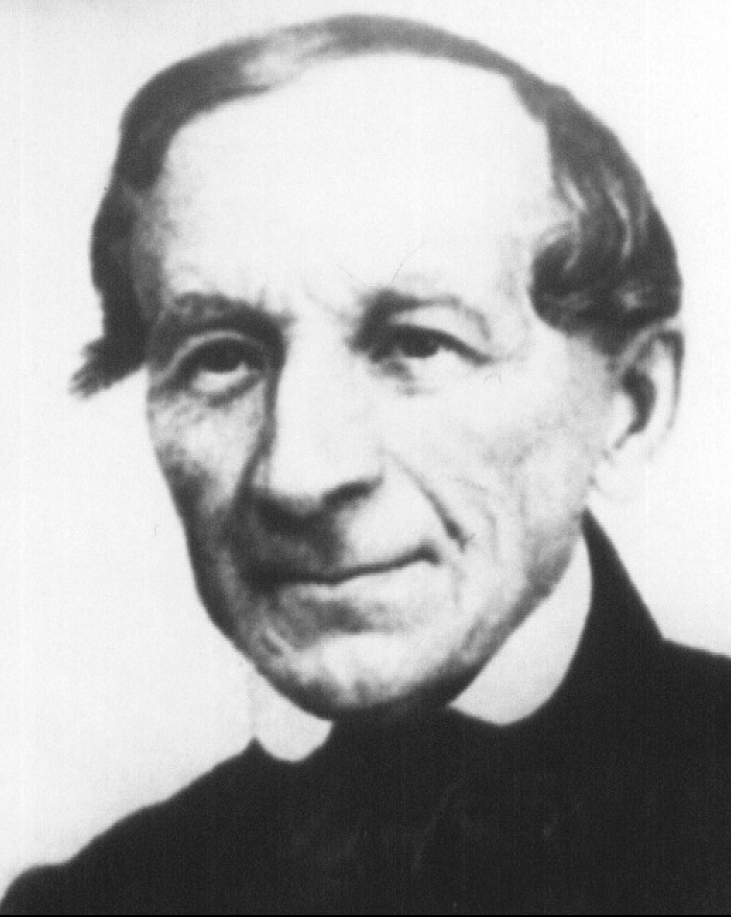
Anton Friedrich Hohl

- Heinrich Albert (composer) (1604–1651), composer
- Anton Friedrich Hohl (1789–1862), physician
- Hans Kollhoff (born 1946), architect
- Anja Rücker (born 1972), athlete; honorary citizen of the town of Bad Lobenstein since 1997
- Curt Teich (1877-1974), publisher

=== Other personalities ===
- Christian Gottlieb Reichard (1758–1837), councilor and general counsel to Lobenstein
- Georg Andreas Sorge (1703–1778), composer, 1721 court organist in Lobenstein.
- Axel Teichmann (born 1979), cross-country skier, visited here school and was appointed honorary citizen on May 2, 2003, due to his great sporting successes
- Heinrich XIII Prinz Reuss (born 1951), aristocrat, member of the local House of Reuss family, businessman, far-right and monarchist activist, and proponent of the Reichsbürger movement, owns the Jagdschloss Waidmannsheil
