= Lobenstein =

Lobenstein may refer to:

== People ==
- Axel Lobenstein (born 1965), German judoka
- Bill Lobenstein (born 1961), American football player
- Joe Lobenstein (died 2015), English politician

== Places ==
- Reuss-Lobenstein, a state located in the German part of the Holy Roman Empire
- Neundorf bei Lobenstein, a municipality in the district Saale-Orla-Kreis, in Thuringia, Germany
- Bad Lobenstein, a town in the Saale-Orla-Kreis district, in Thuringia
