= Gabbe =

Gabbe is a surname. Notable people with the surname include:

- Percy Gabbe (1902–1964), Australian rugby league footballer
- Steven Gabbe, American obstetrician-gynecologist
- Tamara Gabbe (1903–1960), Soviet writer, playwright, and translator

== See also ==
- Gabe (disambiguation)
