= Jacques Guillemeau =

French surgeon (1550–1613)

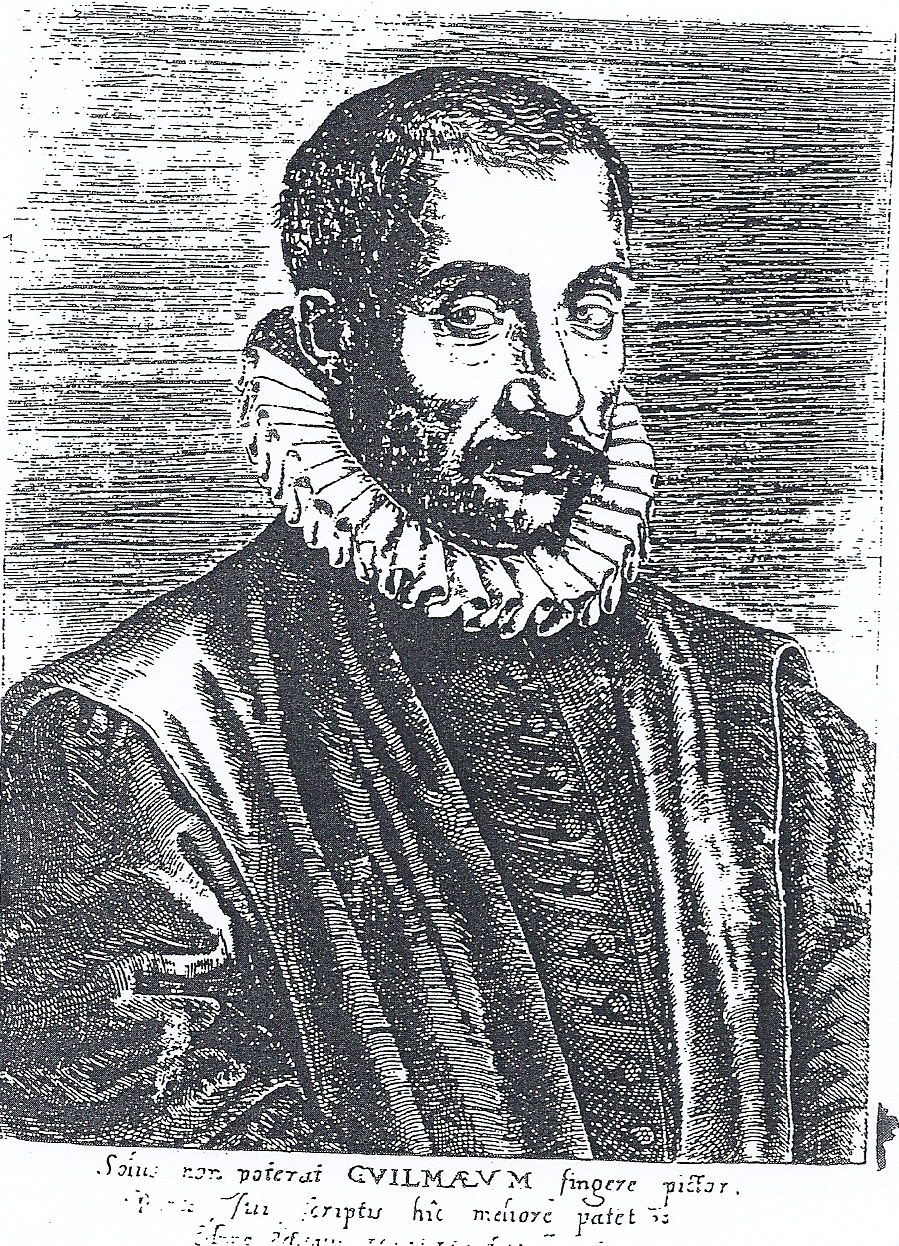
Drawing of Jacques Guillemeau (1550–1613)

Jacques Guillemeau (1550–1613) was a French surgeon from Orléans. He is credited for making pioneer contributions in the fields of obstetrics, ophthalmology and pediatrics.

He was a surgeon at Hôtel-Dieu de Paris, and a favored student of Ambroise Paré (1510–1590), who was also his father-in-law. Guillemeau, like Paré, was a surgeon to French royalty.

In 1584 Guillemeau published Traité des maladies de l'oeil ("Treatise on eye diseases"), considered one of the best Renaissance-era works in ophthalmic medicine. He is also credited for providing the first description involving repair of palpebral coloboma, an eyelid defect he referred to as paupieres accurcies.

In 1609 he published De l'heureux accouchement des femmes ("The happy delivery of women"), the first description of a method of assisted breech delivery popularized by other physicians, and sometimes known as the "Mauriceau–Smellie–Veit maneuver". Guillemeau was a practitioner of the podalic version for use in cases of placenta praevia, a procedure earlier revived by Ambroise Paré.

Other publications by Guillemeau include Tables anatomiques and La chirurgie française.
