= Gustav Veit =

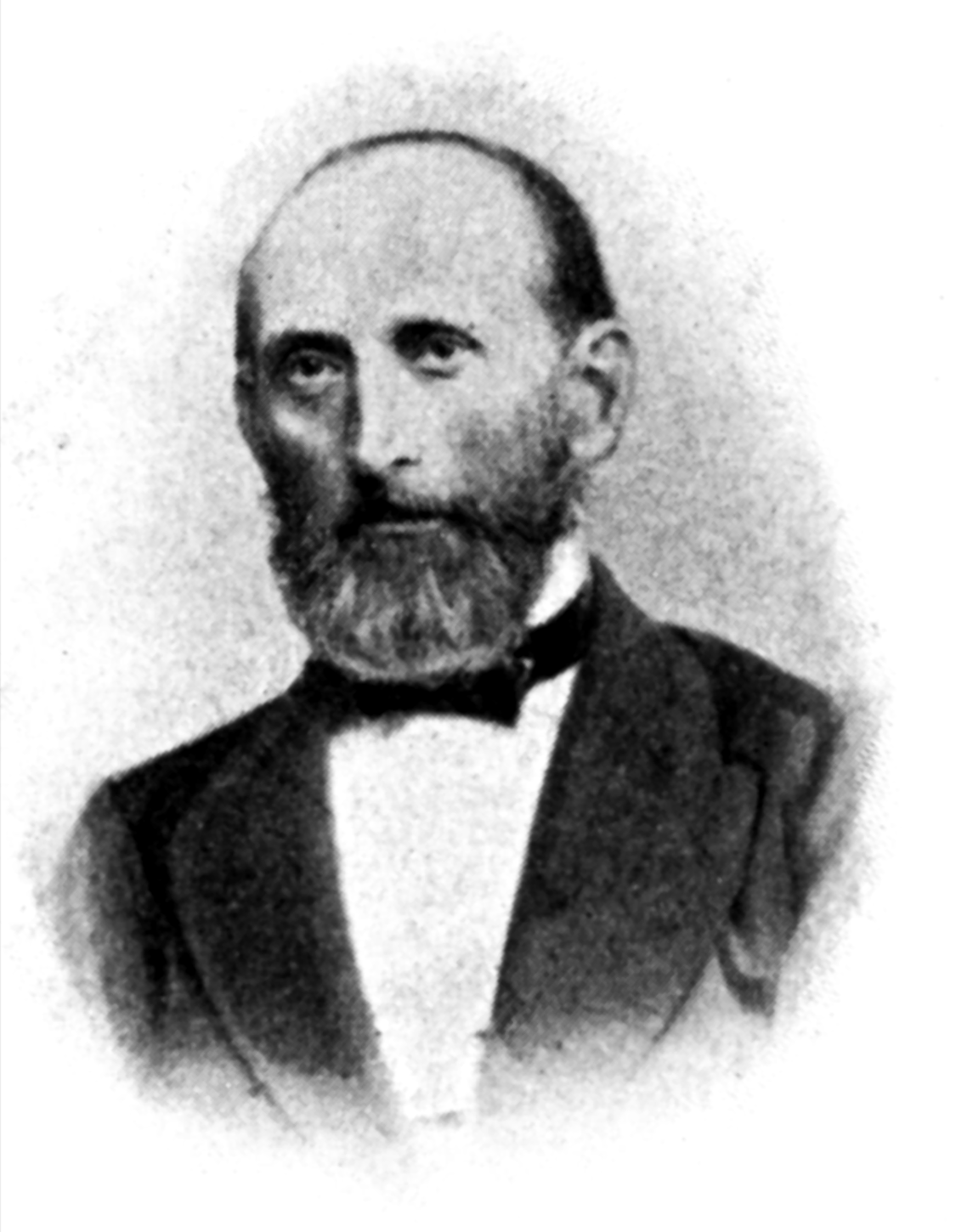
Gustav Veit (1824-1903)

Aloys Constantin Conrad Gustav Veit (June 3, 1824 – April 20, 1903) was a German gynecologist and obstetrician who was a native of Leobschütz. He was the father of gynecologist Johann Veit (1852–1917).

In 1848 he received his medical doctorate from the University of Halle, and following graduation remained in Halle as an assistant to Anton Friedrich Hohl (1789–1862) at the institute of maternity. In 1854 he attained the chair of obstetrics at the University of Rostock, and in 1864 moved to the University of Bonn as professor and director of the department of obstetrics. He died in Deyelsdorf.

His name is associated with the "Mauriceau–Smellie–Veit maneuver", a procedure defined as a classical method of assisted breech delivery. The birthing maneuver is named along with obstetricians François Mauriceau (1637–1709) and William Smellie (1697–1763), although it was first described by Jacques Guillemeau (1550–1613) in a 1609 treatise called De l'accouchement hereux des femmes.

Among his written works was a treatise on diseases of the female sex organs titled Krankheiten der weiblichen Geschlechtsorgane: Puerperalkrankheiten. It was included in Rudolf Virchow's Handbuch der speciellen Pathologie und Therapie (Textbook of Specialized Pathology and Therapy).
