= Benigna Marie of Reuss-Ebersdorf =

- Born: 15 December 1695; Ebersdorf
- Died: 31 July 1751 (aged 55); Pottiga
- Noble family: House of Reuss
- Father: Heinrich X, Count of Reuss-Ebersdorf
- Mother: Erdmuthe Benigna of Solms-Laubach

Benigna Marie of Reuss-Ebersdorf (15 December 1695 in Ebersdorf – 31 July 1751 in Pottiga) was a Protestant German hymn writer and a titular Countess of Reuss. She was a member of the Reuss-Ebersdorf line from the Reuss-Lobenstein.

== Life ==
Benigna Marie was a daughter of Count Heinrich X of Reuss-Ebersdorf (1662-1711) and his wife, Countess Benigna Erdmuthe of Solms-Laubach (1670-1732). She grew up in Ebersdorf and was educated in a strictly pietistic fashion. After her parents' death, she moved to Pottiga.

Here she wrote a series of hymns in the spirit of Zinzendorf, who was married with her younger sister Erdmuthe Dorothea. However, she rejected Zinzendorf's Moravian Church and schism in the Evangelical church that this caused.

She was a close friend of Johann Jakob Moser, and died unmarried in Pottiga, at the 55 years.
