= Karl Ludwig Ernst Schroeder =

German gynecologist (1838-1887)

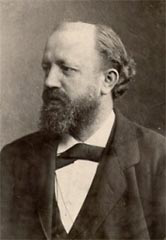
Karl Schroeder

Karl Ludwig Ernst Friedrich Schroeder (11 September 1838, Neustrelitz – 7 February 1887, Berlin) was a German gynecologist .

He studied medicine at the Universities of Würzburg and Rostock. He earned his doctorate in 1864, subsequently serving as an assistant to Gustav Veit (1824-1903) at the University of Bonn. Afterwards he was associated with the University of Erlangen and at the Charité in Berlin. At Erlangen, he succeeded Eugen Rosshirt (1795-1872) as professor of obstetrics (1869), and at the Charité, Schroeder was director of the Frauenklinik.

Schroeder was a catalyst in the construction of the new clinic of gynecology and obstetrics at the Berlin-Charité. It first opened in 1881, and was constructed with an emphasis on hygiene and antisepsis.

Schroeder specialized in research of gynecological diseases, and is remembered for his surgical work with vaginal and endometrial cancers. The eponymous "Schroeder's operation" is another name for excision of diseased endocervical mucosa.

In 1870 he published an important textbook on midwifery that was later translated into English. Among his better known students and assistants were: Carl Arnold Ruge (1846-1926), Johann Veit (1852-1917), Hermann Löhlein (1847-1901), Max Hofmeier (1854-1927) and Richard Frommel (1854-1912).

== Selected works ==
- Lehrbuch der Geburtshülfe mit Einschluss der Pathologie der Schwangerschaft und des Wochenbettes. 1870; (A manual of midwifery: Including the pathology of the pregnancy and the puerperal state) Cohen, Bonn.
- Krankheiten der weiblichen Geschlechtsorgane. (In: Hugo Wilhelm von Ziemssen: Handbuch der speciellen Pathologie und Therapie. Bd. 10) Vogel, Leipzig 1874.
