= Louise Boursier =

French midwife (1563–1636)

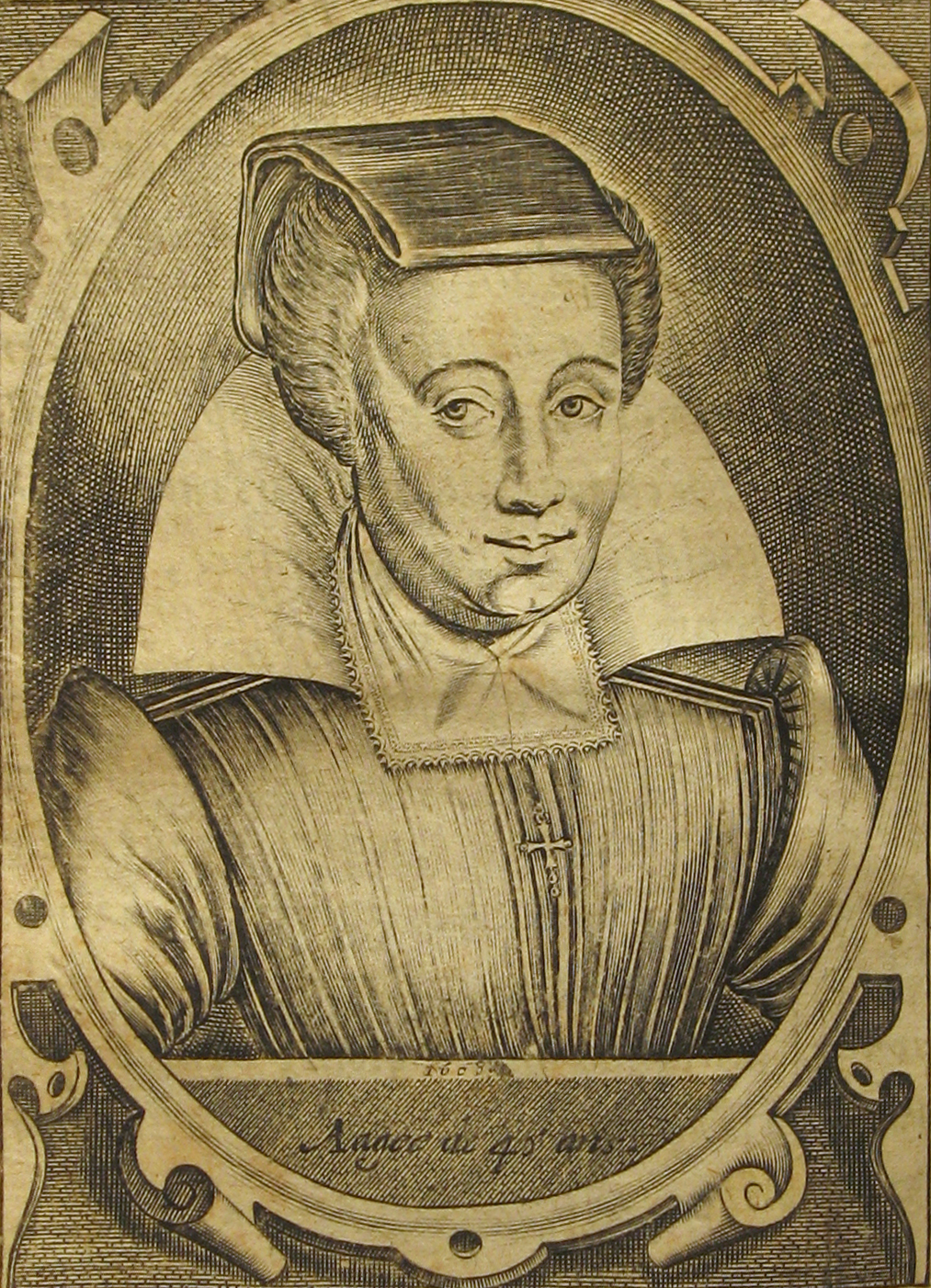
- Portrait, 1642
- Born: 1563; Faubourg Saint-Germain
- Died: 1636 (aged 72–73)
- Education: During childhood was probably tutored in the humanities; taught herself midwifery by reading the writings of the obstetrical innovator Ambroise Paré and possibly by obtaining tips from her surgeon husband (who worked under Paré for twenty years). Also observed both deliveries and the autopsies of women who died in childbirth at the poor hospital in Paris.
- Known for: Scholarly as well as empirically based writings on midwifery and gynecology that include innovative protocols for delivering malpresenting fetuses. Became royal midwife to French royal family and delivered the future Louis XIII and his five siblings. Bourgeois’s successful delivery of the future Louis XIII helped bring about peace and prosperity in the realm after many decades of dynastic and religious war. Known for being the first woman to write a printed medical text in France.
- Spouse(s): Martin Boursier, army surgeon
- Scientific career
- Fields: Midwifery, gynecology
- Workplaces: Courts of Henry IV of France and Louis XIII of France
- Patrons: Queen Marie de Médicis, Louis XIII

Louise (Bourgeois) Boursier (1563–1636) was a French midwife and medical writer who served as a royal midwife at the courts of Henry IV and Louis XIII. Largely self-taught, she became a licensed midwife in Paris in 1598 and was appointed midwife to Queen Marie de' Medici in 1601. Over the next eight years, Bourgeois attended the births of the queen's six children, including the future Louis XIII. She remained a royal court midwife for 26 years.

In 1609, Bourgeois published the first volume of Observations diverses sur la sterilité, perte de fruict, foecondité, accouchements et maladies des femmes et enfants nouveaux naiz, the first book on obstetrics published by a woman. Two further volumes appeared in 1617 and 1626. Drawing on her experience attending births, Bourgeois combined medical instruction with detailed case histories, autobiography, and advice for midwives and women. Her writings addressed pregnancy, childbirth, postpartum care, diseases of women and newborns, and difficult deliveries. She emphasized knowledge gained through observation and practice while also drawing on established medical learning.

Bourgeois wrote for midwives, other medical practitioners, and women themselves. She criticized inadequate knowledge and practice among midwives, surgeons, and physicians, and emphasized learning through exchanges among practitioners. Her works circulated beyond France and were translated into English, German, and Dutch.

== Early life ==
Bourgeois was born into a wealthy, propertied family in 1563 in Faubourg Saint-Germain, an upper-class suburb just outside of Paris. Bourgeois wrote, "Not for anything would we have traded our house for a beautiful one in the city, because … we had everything that those who lived in the city had, plus good air and the freedom of beautiful places to walk."

In 1584, Bourgeois married Martin Boursier, a barber–surgeon who had lived and worked for twenty years with the obstetrical and surgical innovator Ambroise Paré. The couple had a comfortable life until the dynastic and religious wars that had wracked France for over thirty years came to the quiet suburb. In 1589, while her husband was away with the army, troops destroyed Bourgeois’s ancestral home and others like it. She escaped with her three children and mother by fleeing inside the Paris city walls.

Bourgeois wrote that to make ends meet she sold the furniture and other objects she had salvaged from her home as well as items she had embroidered. Life was difficult while her husband was at the front lines, but their financial circumstances did not improve after he returned in late 1593 or early 1594. Bourgeois recounts that because she could read and had a surgeon for a husband, "[A] respectable woman [that is, an unlicensed midwife] who had delivered me of my three children and who liked me persuaded me to learn how to be a midwife." Initially, Bourgeois writes, "I could not bring myself to [become a midwife] when I thought of the [responsibility of] taking children to be baptized. … In the end … fear of seeing my children go hungry made me do it."

== Education ==
Unlike the majority of practicing midwives, Bourgeois did not learn midwifery by apprenticing to a more experienced midwife nor does she acknowledge that her husband instructed her. Instead, she recounts that she read the work of Ambroise Paré who, by 1593 or 1594 when Bourgeois decided to become a midwife, was deceased (he died in 1590). In Paré’s writing, Bourgeois would have found instructions on how to perform an obstetrical technique called podalic version that he reintroduced into medical practice; the technique allows a birth attendant to deliver a malpresenting infant feet first. This procedure obviated the need to use hooks or other sharp instruments to extract an impacted fetus, a procedure that killed the fetus and sometimes mortally harmed the mother.

Paré also emphasized the importance of learning human anatomy by performing dissections, a part of medical and surgical training to which most midwives never had access. However, Bourgeois had a friendship with the head midwife at Paris’s Hôtel-Dieu (poor hospital); she allowed Bourgeois to witness both deliveries of infants and autopsies of women who had died in childbirth. These experiences contributed to her knowledge of female anatomy and the skills required to deliver a baby safely. At the time, the Hôtel-Dieu was the only institution in Paris where women could obtain formal training in midwifery. But apprenticeships were limited: only four interns were accepted every three months.

== Licensing ==
In 1598, Bourgeois went before the official medical licensing board to receive a midwifery license. The board consisted of two senior midwives, a physician, and two surgeons. Madame Dupuis, one of the two senior midwives, was royal midwife in the court of Henri IV. Dupuis objected to Bourgeois’s obtaining a license because she was married to a surgeon. At the time, Parisian surgeons were competing with midwives for the most elite clients. Bourgeois claims that Dupuis remarked: "My heart tells me this doesn’t bode well for us." Bourgeois adds that Dupuis kept her for a long time and threatened to have her burned at the stake if she tried to compete with Dupuis. Despite Dupuis’s concerns, the other members of the board allowed Bourgeois to receive her license and become a sworn midwife.

== Career ==
Bourgeois recounts that her first client was her porter’s wife. Following this first delivery, she became "quite busy among the poor and other kinds of people."

In 1601, three years after receiving her midwifery license, Bourgeois learned that Marie de' Medici, the new queen of France and wife of Henry IV, was pregnant and did not find Madame Dupuis, the royal midwife, "agreeable." Remembering the difficulties Dupuis had caused her during her licensing examination, Bourgeois confessed, "I [too] would have wanted another woman." With the help of neighbors, friends, former clients, royal physicians, and members of the queen's household, Bourgeois devised a campaign to replace Dupuis. Although she could not arrange a private meeting with the queen, her supporters drew Marie de' Medici's attention to her during a banquet at the House of Gondi, where the royal couple dined once or twice a week. Impressed by Bourgeois's calm demeanor and upright bearing, qualities associated at the time with moral and physical strength, the queen declared that she wanted no other midwife to ever touch her.

In 1601, Bourgeois delivered Louis XIII, the future king of France. He was the first of six children of Marie de' Medici and Henry IV whose births she attended. She subsequently delivered Elisabeth, the future queen of Spain, in 1602; Christine Marie, the future duchess of Savoy, and Nicolas Henri, the future duke of Orléans, in 1607; Gaston, the future duke of Orléans, in 1608; and Henrietta Maria, the future queen of England, Scotland, and Ireland, in 1609.

Bourgeois was paid 900 livres for each of the last four royal births, eight times the average salary of a municipal midwife. In 1608, she received an additional 6,000 livres, most likely in recognition of her services to the royal family. The following year, after the queen's sixth and final childbirth, Bourgeois requested a pension. Henry IV granted her an annual pension of 900 livres, an amount considered sufficient for retirement.

Bourgeois served as a royal court midwife for 26 years. In 1627, Marie de Bourbon, Duchess of Montpensier, the wife of Gaston and sister-in-law of Louis XIII, died following a difficult childbirth attended by Bourgeois. An autopsy was performed, and the resulting report stated that pieces of the placenta had remained in the uterus.

Bourgeois responded to the report in the 1627 pamphlet Apologie de Louyse Bourgeois dite Bourcier, Sage femme de la Royne mere du Roy, & de feu Madame. Contre le rapport des medecins, in which she defended her conduct and professional competence. She emphasized her qualifications, cited her 34 years of practice as a midwife, and noted that she had obtained the required license and written books on midwifery that were used by physicians in England and Germany. She maintained that she had delivered the placenta properly and argued that any small pieces remaining would have been expelled with the lochia, citing the ancient Greek physician Paul of Aegina and the Italian anatomist Hieronymus Fabricius. The dispute damaged Bourgeois's position at court, and she left royal service after the controversy.

== Writing ==
=== Overview ===
Bourgeois’s success as a royal midwife provided her with a large salary, while the literary patronage of Queen Marie de' Medici helped her publish Observations diverses in three volumes between 1609 and 1626. The books combined medical instruction with autobiography, accounts of past events, poetry, and advice to her daughter. She sought to educate midwives and other medical practitioners, while also giving women practical information about pregnancy, childbirth, recovery after birth, and their own bodies. She wanted women to understand their bodies well enough to describe their medical problems more effectively to physicians.

Bourgeois’s understanding of health and disease was grounded in humoral medicine, the prevailing medical system in which health was understood in terms of the balance and movement of bodily fluids. At the same time, she tested established medical teachings against what she observed in her patients and recorded her experiences in numerous detailed case histories.

In early 17th-century Paris, midwives occupied the lowest position in the medical hierarchy. Above them were barber-surgeons and apothecaries, followed by surgeons, while university-trained physicians held the highest status. Male surgeons were increasingly being hired by wealthy families for normal births as well as difficult deliveries, bringing them into competition with skilled midwives for wealthy clients. Bourgeois criticized poor knowledge and practice among midwives, surgeons, and physicians alike. She emphasized learning through exchanges with other midwives and medical practitioners, as well as teaching them and lay readers.

=== Observations diverses vol. I (1609) ===
Published in Paris in 1609, when Bourgeois was about 46 years old, Observations diverses was her first published work. Drawing on more than 15 years of experience as a practicing midwife, including eight years as Marie de' Medici's royal midwife, the volume was intended as both a practical handbook for midwives and a guide for pregnant and postpartum women. It presented practical protocols for difficult births, including instructions for inducing labour in cases of a contracted pelvis, delivering an infant in a face presentation, and safely cutting an umbilical cord wrapped around the infant's neck between two ligatures.

Rather than relying primarily on ancient medical authorities, Bourgeois based her recommendations on observations drawn from her own practice, illustrating many of them with detailed case histories. The volume also included medicinal recipes for common obstetrical and postpartum problems. Bourgeois wrote that she had personally tested some remedies before recommending them, including one she developed after treating her own bruised nipple with a preparation of agrimony, mallow, marshmallow, groundsel, pig fat, and May butter. Throughout the volume, she emphasized practical experience over theory as a means of improving outcomes for mothers and newborns.

=== Observations diverses (1617) ===
Published in Paris in 1617, eight years after the first volume of Observations diverses, the second volume reflected more than two decades of experience as a practicing midwife, including 16 years as royal midwife to Marie de' Medici. While the first volume focused primarily on practical instruction, Bourgeois broadened the second to include autobiographical essays, case histories, and reflections on her profession. In doing so, she presented herself not only as an experienced midwife but also as a teacher, using her own experiences to instruct future practitioners.

The volume opened with "Advice to My Daughter", in which Bourgeois described the qualities she believed every midwife should possess, including patience, humility, compassion, discretion, and a commitment to lifelong learning. In "How I Learned the Art of Midwifery", she explained how she developed her skills through observation, practical experience, and discussions with other midwives, physicians, and surgeons. Throughout these essays, she argued that practical experience was as important as knowledge gained from medical books.

Bourgeois also described attending the births of Louis XIII and his siblings, using these accounts to illustrate the challenges of caring for the French royal family. She explained the decisions she made during difficult deliveries and the importance of remaining calm under intense pressure. Her accounts provide a rare first-hand description of childbirth at the French royal court from the perspective of an attending midwife.

Like the first volume, Observations diverses included case histories describing difficult pregnancies, labour, childbirth, and postpartum care. Bourgeois used these stories to illustrate practical lessons, often reflecting on what particular cases had taught her. She wrote openly about both successful and unsuccessful outcomes, treating mistakes and uncertainty as opportunities for learning rather than failures to conceal. By combining practical instruction with personal experience and case histories, Bourgeois created a work that served as both a guide for midwives and an account of her professional practice.

=== Observations diverses vol. III (1626) ===
The third volume, published in 1626, was the briefest; it contains case histories that emphasize the importance of orally transmitted knowledge, and Bourgeois wrote of her growing concern about incompetent physicians who advise women without really understanding the signs of or other aspects of pregnancy.

=== Recueil de secrets (1635) ===
One year before her death, and only because of the persistent urging of her publisher, Bourgeois published Recueil de secrets, a book of remedies. Her reluctance to publish stemmed from her concern about including recipes for certain remedies that she had been keeping secret in order to pass them on to her daughter, Antoinette, who was also a midwife. The publisher wrote, "The only thing that kept her from bowing to my prayers for a long time was the consideration of her daughter, who had embraced her profession, which she feared to harm. Finally recognizing that she had acquired by her skill and great judgment, such a reputation, that she [her daughter] was henceforth quite recommendable in herself, without her needing to be so by her mother’s secrets, gave me this manuscript."

== Death ==
Bourgeois died on 20 December 1636. She was buried with her ancestors, who lived outside of Paris, rather than with her husband, whose grave was in the city.

== Publications by Louise Bourgeouis ==
- 1609: Observations diverses sur la stérilité, perte de fruict, foecondité, accouchements et maladies des femmes et enfants nouveaux naiz, 1 vol. Paris, Saugrain (1er volume).
- 1617: Observations diverses sur la stérilité, perte de fruict, foecondité, accouchements et maladies des femmes et enfants nouveaux naiz, 2 vols. Paris, Saugrain.
- 1626: Observations diverses sur la stérilité, perte de fruict, foecondité, accouchements et maladies des femmes et enfants nouveaux naiz, 3 vols. Paris, Mondiere.
- 1627: Apologie de Louyse Bourgeois dite Bourcier, Sage femme de la Royne mere du Roy, & de feu Madame. Contre le rapport des medecins. Paris, Mondiere.
- 1627(?): Fidelle relation de l’accouchement, maladie et ouverture du corps de feu Madame [s.l.]
- 1635: Recueil des secrets. Paris, Mondiere.

== See also ==
- Timeline of women in science

== Suggested Reading ==
Bourgeois, Louise. Midwife to the Queen of France: Diverse Observations. Edited by Alison Klairmont Lingo. Translated by Stephanie O’Hara. Toronto and Tempe: Iter and Arizona Center for Medieval and Renaissance Studies, 2017.

Bourgeois, Louise. Observations diverses sur la stérilité, perte de fruits, fécondité, accouchements et maladies des femmes et enfants nouveau-nés; suivi de Instructions à ma fille: 1609. Edited by Françoise Olive. Paris: Côté-femmes, 1992.

Broomhall, Susan. Women’s Medical Work in Early Modern France. Manchester, UK: Manchester University Press, 2004.

Chereau, Achille. Marie de Medici Queen of France and Navarre Six Deliveries. Paris: Willem Press, 1875.

Gelbart, Nina Rattner, The King’s Midwife: A History and Mystery of Madame du Coudray. Berkeley: University of California Press, 1998.

Green, Monica. Making Women’s Medicine Masculine: The Rise of Male Authority in Pre-Modern Gynaecology. Oxford, UK: Oxford University Press, 2008.

Green, Monica. Women’s Healthcare in the Medieval West: Texts and Contexts. Aldershot, UK: Routledge, 2002.

Klairmont Lingo, Alison. “Louise Bourgeois’s School of Learning and Action.” Women’s Studies: An Interdisciplinary Journal 49, no. 3 (2020): 229–255. doi.org/ 10.1080/00497878.2020.1714396.

Klairmont Lingo, Alison. “Connaître le secret des femmes: Louise Bourgeois (1563–1636), sage-femme de la reine, et Jacques Guillemeau (1549–1613), chirurgien du roi.” In Enfanter: discours, pratiques et représentations de l’accouchement, ed. Adeline Gargam, 113–126. France: Artois Presses Université, 2017.

Klairmont Lingo, Alison. “Louise Bourgeois.” In Dictionnaire des femmes de l’Ancienne France, ed. Marie-Elisabeth Henneau. SIEFAR, 2016.

Morwiche, Pascale, Donner vie au royaume. Grossesses et maternités à la Cour, XVIIe–XVIIIe siècle. Paris: CNRS Editions, 2022.

O’Hara, Stephanie. “Translation, Gender, and Early Modern Midwifery: Louise Bourgeois’s Observations diverses and The Compleat Midwife’s Practice.” New England Journal of History 65, no. 1 (2008): 28–55.

Perkins, Wendy. Midwifery Medicine in Modern France: Louise Bourgeois. Exeter, UK: University of Exeter Press, 1996.

Read, Kirk D. Birthing Bodies in Early France: Stories of Gender and Reproduction. Abingdon, UK: Routledge, 2011.

Robin, Diana, Anne R. Larsen, and Carole Levin, eds. Encyclopedia of Women in the Renaissance: Italy, France, and England. Santa Barbara, CA: ABC-CLIO, 2007.

Sheridan, Bridgette. “Whither Childbearing: Gender, Status, and the Professionalization of Medicine in Early Modern France.” In Gender and Scientific Discourse in Early Modern, ed. Kathleen P. Long, 239–258. Abingdon, UK: Routledge, 2016.

Thomas, Samuel. “Early Modern Midwifery: Splitting the Profession, Connecting the History.” Journal of Social History 43, no. 1 (2009): 115–138.

Tucker, Holly. Pregnant Fictions: Childbirth and the Fairy Tale in Early Modern France. Detroit, IL: Wayne State University Press, 2003.

Worth-Stylianou, Valerie. “Birthing Tales in French Medical Works ca.1500–1650.” www.birthingtales.org.

Worth-Stylianou, Valerie. Pregnancy and Birth in Early Modern France: Treatises by Caring Physicians and Surgeons (1581–1625). Toronto: Centre for Reformation and Renaissance Studies, 2013.
