= Carl Arnold Ruge =

German pathologist (1846–1926)

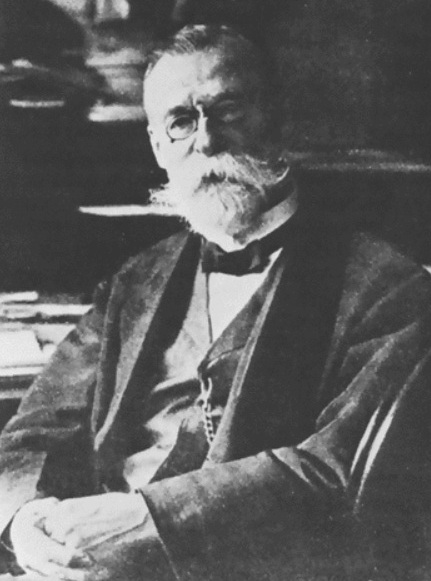
Carl Arnold Ruge (1846-1926)

Carl Arnold Ruge (24 September 1846 – 15 April 1926) was a German pathologist who was a native of Berlin. He is credited for contributions made in the early detection of uterine cancer. Ruge was a nephew of pathologist Rudolf Virchow (1821-1902).

For a number of years he served as director of the laboratory for microscopic and clinical research in the Frauenklinik at the Charité-Berlin. In Berlin he worked closely with gynecologist Karl Ludwig Ernst Schroeder (1838-1887). From 1882 to 1912 he was director of the pathological institute for gynecology at the university Frauenklinik. In 1896 he was appointed professor.

Ruge pioneered microscopic diagnostics in the field of gynecology. With his associate Johann Veit (1852–1917), he is credited with establishing the groundwork for contemporary gynecological pathology and histology. In the 1870s the two men introduced the surgical biopsy as a necessary diagnostics tool. From their biopsies, they demonstrated that there were too many cases of unnecessary surgeries for cervical cancer, proving that physicians were often incapable of detecting cancer without the aid of a biopsy.

Ruge is also credited with having first defined varicose veins as "any dilated, elongated and tortuous vein irrespective of size".
