= Rosenthal am Rennsteig =

- Municipality
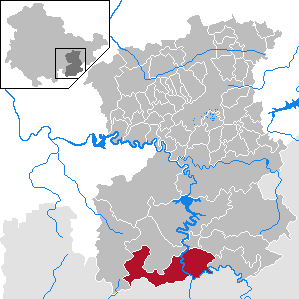
- Location of Rosenthal am Rennsteig within Saale-Orla-Kreis district
- Interactive map of Rosenthal am Rennsteig
- Location within Germany Location within Thuringia
- Coordinates: 50°24′N 11°42′E
- Country: Germany
- State: Thuringia
- District: Saale-Orla-Kreis
- Subdivisions: 10

Government
  - Mayor (2022–28): Alex Neumüller (CDU)

Area
  - Total: 56.49 km^{2} (21.81 sq mi)
- Elevation: 640 m (2,100 ft)

Population (2025-12-31)
  - Total: 3,669
  - Density: 64.95/km^{2} (168.2/sq mi)
- Time zone: UTC+01:00 (CET)
  - Summer (DST): UTC+02:00 (CEST)
- Postal codes: 07366
- Dialling codes: 036642, 036651
- Vehicle registration: SOK

Rosenthal am Rennsteig (German pronunciation: [ˈʁoːzn̩taːl ʔam ˈʁɛnʃtaɪk], lit. 'Rosenthal on the Rennsteig') is a municipality in the district Saale-Orla-Kreis, in Thuringia, Germany. It was created with effect from 1 January 2019 by the merger of the former municipalities of Birkenhügel, Blankenberg, Blankenstein, Harra, Neundorf bei Lobenstein, Pottiga and Schlegel.
