= Eugen Rosshirt =

German obstetrician and gynecologist

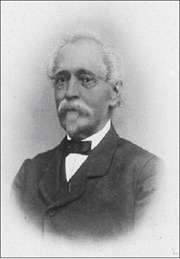
Johann Eugen Rosshirt

Johann Eugen Rosshirt (11 November 1795 – 13 July 1872) was a German obstetrician and gynecologist who was a native of Oberscheinfeld.

He studied medicine at the University of Würzburg, where he earned his doctorate in 1818. Afterwards, he was an instructor of midwifery and prosector-surgery at Bamberg, and in 1833 succeeded Michael Jäger (1795–1838) as director of the obstetrics hospital at the University of Erlangen. He would remain at Erlangen until his retirement in 1868.

Rosshirt is remembered for his efforts in trying to establish women's healthcare as a separate and specialized area of study at Erlangen. Under Rosshirt's direction, a new building located near the university hospital was used as a women's clinic (1854). A growing number of births and students, as well as the initiation of gynecological practices led to creation in 1878, during Karl Schroeder's tenure, of the first "modern" gynecological hospital at Erlangen.

== Selected publications ==
- De uteri sub graviditate metamorphosi. Würzburg 1818, (dissertation).
- De perforatione fetu licet vivo instituenda. Heyder, Erlangen 1833.
- De Asphyxia Infantium Recens Natorum. Heyder, Erlangen 1834.
- Die Anzeigen zu den geburtshülflichen Operationen. (Indices of obstetrical operations), Palm und Enke, Erlangen 1835.
- Die geburtshülflichen Operationen. (The obstretrical operation), Palm und Enke, Erlangen 1842.
- Quaedam ad artis obstetriciae, uti nunc exercetur, statum pertinentia. Junge, Erlangen 1843.
- Lehrbuch der Geburtshilfe. (Textbook of obstetrics), Heyder & Zimmer, Erlangen 1851.
