= Blankenstein =

- Ortsteil of Rosenthal am Rennsteig
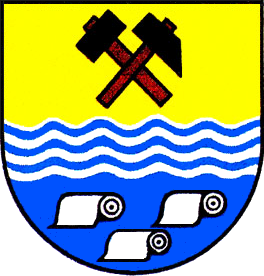
- Coat of arms
- Interactive map of Blankenstein
- Location within Germany Location within Thuringia
- Coordinates: 50°24′7″N 11°42′1″E
- Country: Germany
- State: Thuringia
- District: Saale-Orla-Kreis
- Municipality: Rosenthal am Rennsteig

Area
  - Total: 1.54 km^{2} (0.59 sq mi)
- Elevation: 450 m (1,480 ft)

Population (2017-12-31)
  - Total: 705
  - Density: 458/km^{2} (1,190/sq mi)
- Time zone: UTC+01:00 (CET)
  - Summer (DST): UTC+02:00 (CEST)
- Postal codes: 07366
- Dialling codes: 036642
- Vehicle registration: SOK
- Website: www.gemeinde-blankenstein.de

Blankenstein (German pronunciation: [ˈblaŋkn̩ʃtaɪn]) is a village and a former municipality in the district Saale-Orla-Kreis, in Thuringia, Germany. On 1 January 2019 it became part of the new municipality Rosenthal am Rennsteig. Prior to 2019, Blankenstein had been the seat of the Saale-Rennsteig Verwaltungsgemeinschaft (municipal association), which was disbanded in the reorganisation.

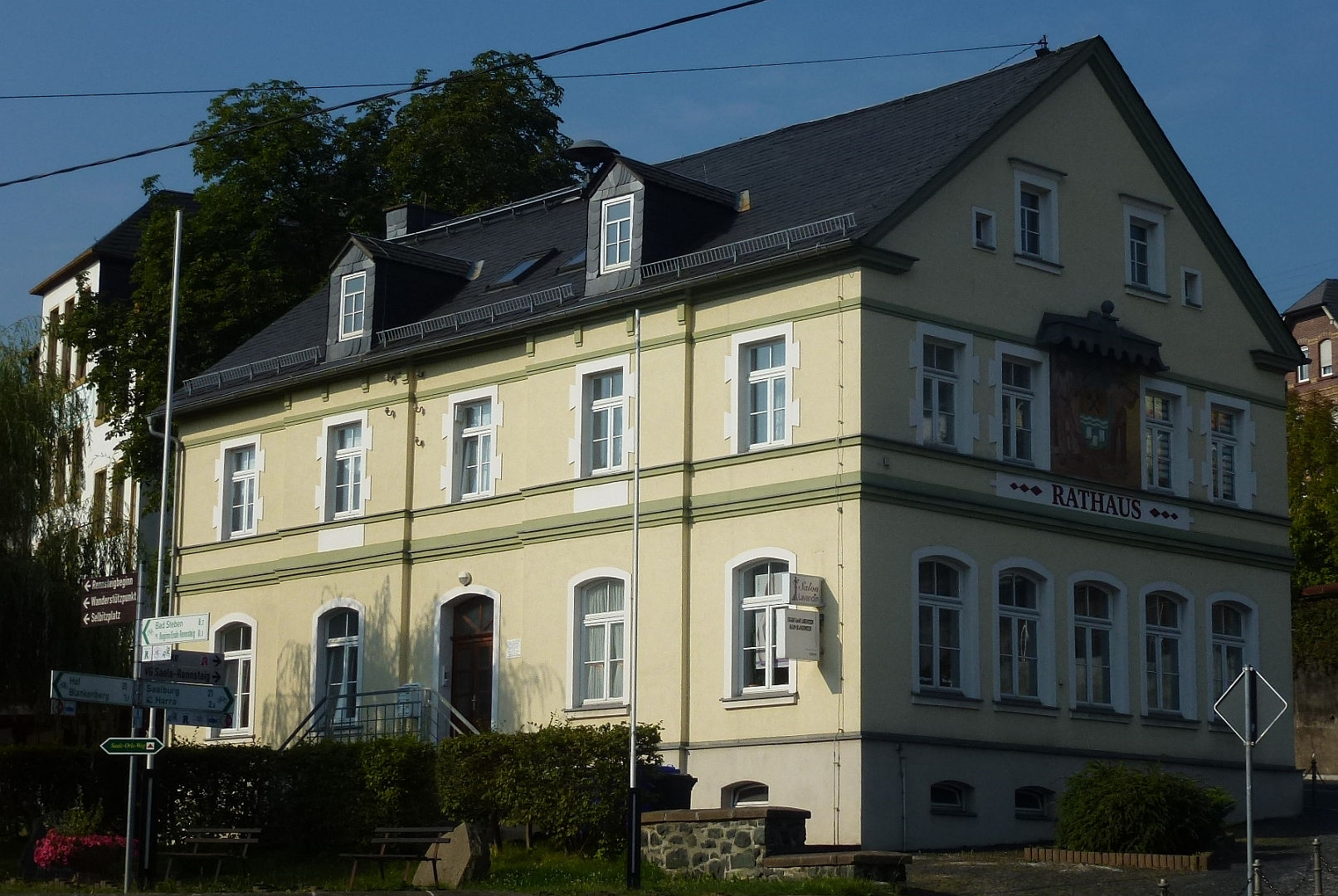
The city hall of Blankenstein

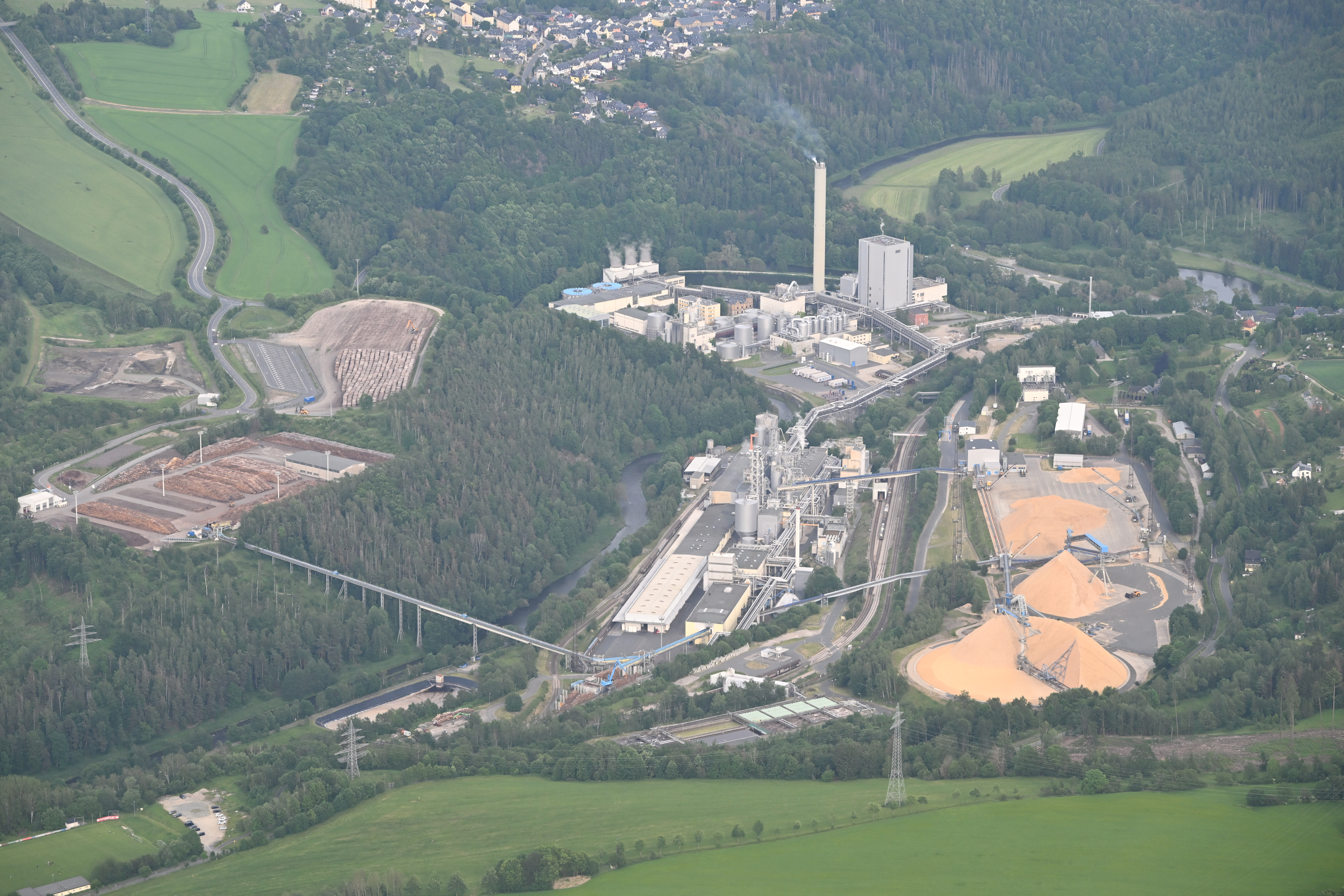
Pulp factory in Blankenstein
