= Johann Veit =

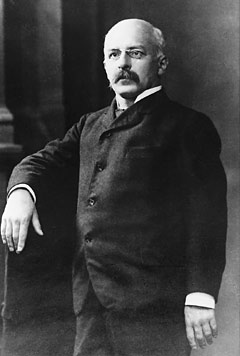
Johann Veit (1852-1917)

Johann Veit (17 June 1852, Berlin – 2 June 1917 near Schierke) was a German gynecologist. He was the son of obstetrician and gynecologist Gustav Veit (1824-1903).

In 1874 he earned his medical degree at Humboldt University in Berlin, and in 1879 became an assistant physician at the university Frauenklinik. While still a student, he served as a medic during the Franco-Prussian War.

In 1893 he attained the title of professor extraordinarius (associate professor), afterwards serving as a professor at the Universities of Leiden (1896), Erlangen (1902) and Halle (1904). At Halle he served as university rector in 1911–12.

Veit is renowned for adapting the knowledge of immunology into the field of gynecology. He was successful in treatment of cancer with radium, and was involved in training nurses and midwives for service in the German colonies and diaconal hospitals in the Middle East.

During his tenure in Berlin, Veit worked closely with Carl Arnold Ruge (1846-1926) in establishing gynecological histopathology standards, particularly involving the setup of microscopic diagnostics for early detection and analysis of uterus carcinomas.

His written works included publications on female reproductive anatomy, gynecological diseases and ectopic pregnancy. With Robert von Olshausen (1835-1915), he was co-editor of Karl Schroeder's Lehrbuch der Geburshülfte.
