= Harry Köcher =

German sports shooter

Personal information
- Born: 16 February 1933 Schlegel, Thuringia, Germany
- Died: 2003 (aged 69–70)

Sport
- Sport: Sports shooting

Harry Köcher (16 February 1933 – 2003) was a German sports shooter. He competed in two events at the 1964 Summer Olympics.
