= Hermann Löhlein =

German obstetrician and gynecologist

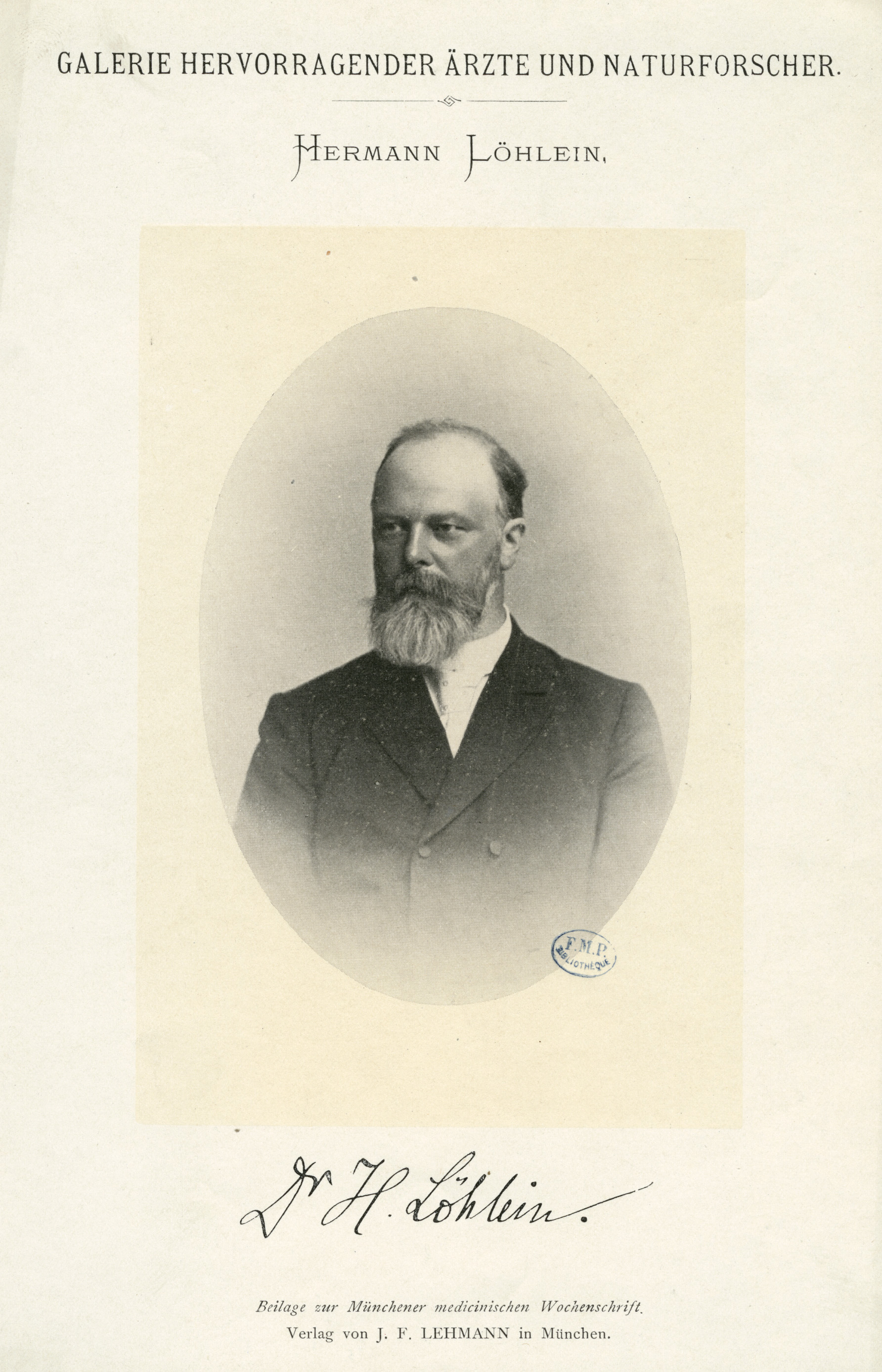
Hermann Löhlein

Christian Adolf Hermann Löhlein (26 May 1847 in Coburg – 25 November 1901) was a German obstetrician and gynecologist.

In 1870, he obtained his medical doctorate following studies at the universities of Jena and Berlin. Afterwards he spent several years at Berlin as an assistant in the clinic of Eduard Arnold Martin (1809–1875). From 1875 to 1888, he was a lecturer in obstetrics and gynecology in Berlin, followed by a professorship at the University of Giessen. Here he was successor to Max Hofmeier (1854–1927) as chair of OB/GYN, becoming university rector in 1898. At Giessen he was also editor of the Gynäkologische Tagesfragen (Gynecological issues of the day).

== Principal writings ==
- Über das Verhalten des Herzens bei Schwangern und Wöchnerinnen, 1876 – On the behavior of the heart in pregnant women and in new mothers.
- Ovarialtumoren und Ovariotomie in Schwangerschaft, Geburt und Wochenbett, 1895 – Ovarian tumors and ovariotomy in pregnancy, birth and postpartum.
- Leistungen und Aufgaben der geburtshülflichen Institute im Dienst der Humanität, 1899 – Services and tasks of obstetric institutions in serving humanity.
- Zur Lehre vom durchweg zu engen Becken – Doctrine of the consistently too narrow pelvis.
