= Ambroise Paré =

French barber surgeon (c. 1510–1590)

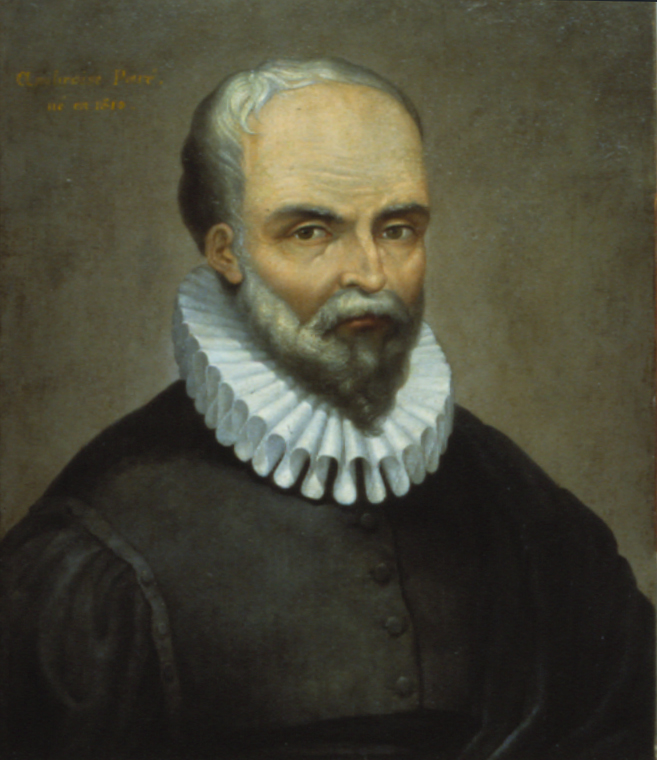
- Portrait based on 1573 engraving
- Born: 1510; Bourg-Hersent near Laval, France
- Died: 20 December 1590 (aged 79–80); Paris, France
- Citizenship: France
- Education: Hôtel-Dieu de Paris (apprenticeship)
- Known for: Contributions to surgery
- Scientific career
- Fields: Barber surgery

Ambroise Paré (French: [ɑ̃bʁwaz paʁe]; c. 1510 – 20 December 1590) was a French barber surgeon who served in that role for kings Henry II, Francis II, Charles IX and Henry III. He is considered one of the fathers of surgery and forensic pathology, and a pioneer in surgical techniques and battlefield medicine, especially in the treatment of wounds. He was also an anatomist, invented several surgical instruments, and was a member of the Parisian barber surgeon guild.

In his personal notes about the care he delivered to Captain Rat, in the Piémont campaign (1537–1538), Paré wrote: Je le pansai, Dieu le guérit ("I bandaged him and God healed him"). This epitomises a philosophy that he used throughout his career. These words, inscribed on his statue in Laval, are reminiscent of the Latin adage medicus curat, natura sanat, "The physician cures, nature heals".

== Early life ==
Paré was born in 1510 in Bourg-Hersent, later incorporated into Laval, then part of the province of Maine, in northwestern France. As a child he watched, and was first apprenticed to, his older brother, a barber-surgeon in Paris. He was also a pupil at Hôtel-Dieu de Paris, France's oldest hospital.

== Medicine ==
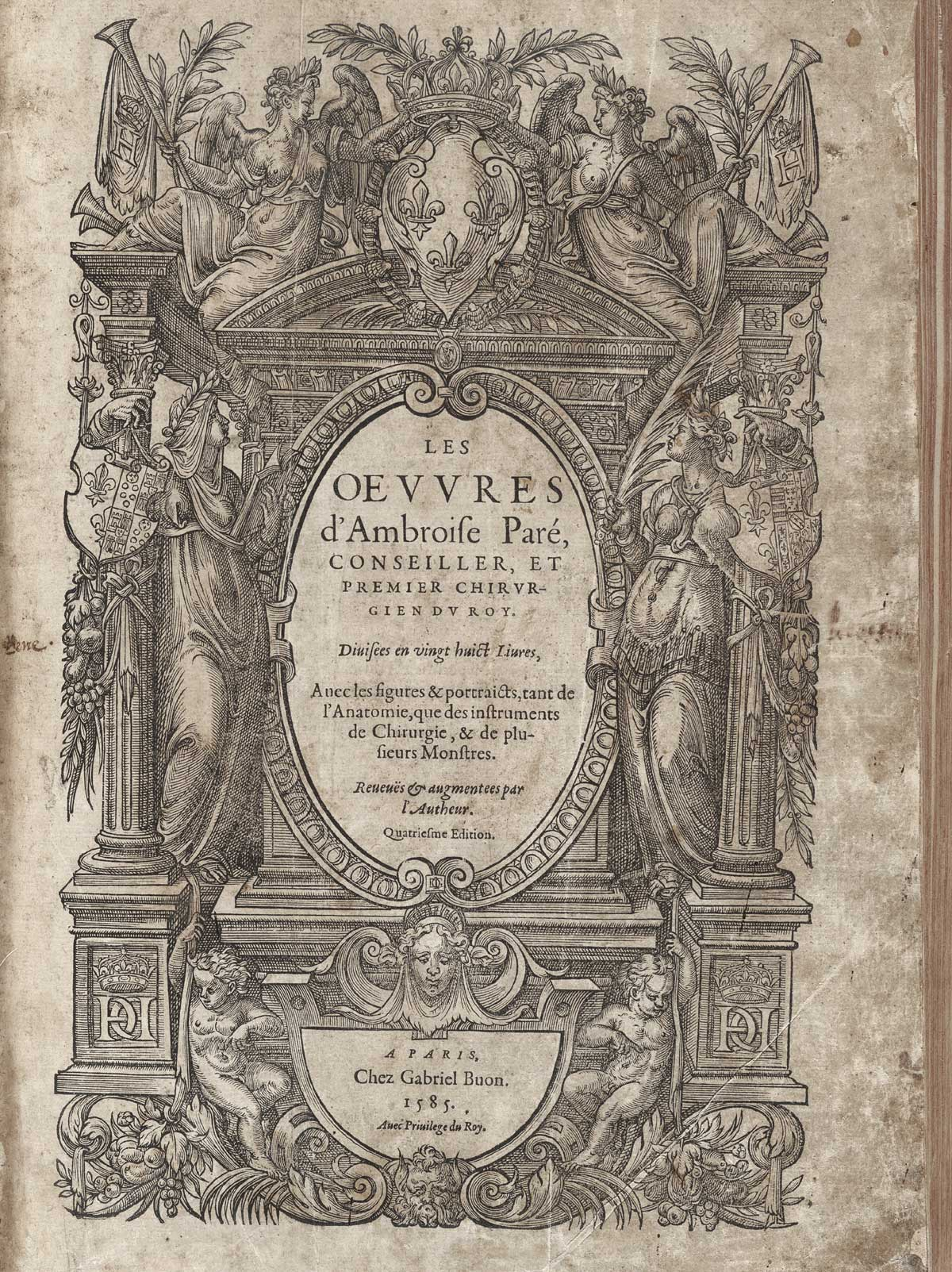
The title page of Ambroise Paré's Oeuvres

Paré was a keen observer and did not allow the beliefs of the day to supersede the evidence at hand. In his autobiographical book, Journeys in Diverse Places, Paré inadvertently practised the scientific method when he returned the following morning to a battlefield. He compared one group of patients who were treated in the traditional manner with boiling elder oil and cauterization, and the remainder with a recipe made of egg yolk, oil of roses and turpentine, and left overnight. Paré discovered that the soldiers treated with the boiling oil were in agony, whereas the ones treated with the ointment had recovered because of the antiseptic properties of turpentine. This proved this method's efficacy, and he avoided cauterization thereafter. However, treatments such as this were not widely used until many years later. He published his first book The method of curing wounds caused by arquebus and firearms in 1545.

Paré also reintroduced the ligature of arteries (first used by Galen and later described by Al-Zahrawi) instead of cauterization during amputation. The usual method of sealing wounds by searing with a red-hot iron often failed to arrest the bleeding and caused patients to die of shock. For the ligature technique he designed the "Bec de Corbeau" ("crow's beak"), a predecessor to modern haemostats. Although ligatures often spread infection, it was still an important breakthrough in surgical practice. Paré detailed the technique of using ligatures to prevent hemorrhaging during amputation in his 1564 book Treatise on Surgery. During his work with injured soldiers, Paré documented the pain experienced by amputees which they perceive as sensation in the 'phantom' amputated limb. Paré believed that phantom pains occur in the brain (the consensus of the medical community today) and not in remnants of the limb. He also performed many neurosurgical procedures.

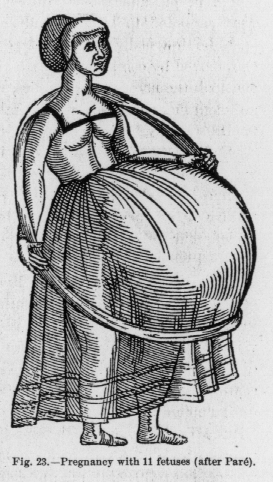
"Pregnancy with 11 fetuses (after Paré)." Giovanni Pico della Mirandola reported the case of an Italian woman, Dorothea, who allegedly gave birth to undecaplets after having given birth to nonuplets. This illustration is a copy of an original by Ambroise Paré from the 1900 edition of Anomalies and Curiosities of Medicine.

In 1542, during the siege of Perpignan, Paré, accompanying the French army, employed a novel technique to aid in bullet extraction. During a battle, Maréchal de Brissac was wounded, having been shot in the shoulder. When finding the bullet seemed impossible, Paré had the idea to ask the victim to put himself in the exact position he was in when shot. The bullet was then found and removed by Henry's personal surgeon, Nicole Lavernault.

Paré was also an important figure in the progress of obstetrics in the middle of the 16th century. He revived the practice of podalic version, and showed how even in cases of head presentation, surgeons with this operation could often deliver the infant safely, instead of having to dismember the infant and extract the infant piece by piece. During his time at the Hôtel-Dieu, Paré directly influenced the education of future royal midwife Louise Boursier.

Paré also introduced the lancing of infants' gums using a lancet during teething, in the belief that teeth were failing to emerge from the gums due to lack of a pathway, and that this failure was a cause of death. This belief and practice persisted for centuries, with some exceptions, until towards the end of the nineteenth century lancing became increasingly controversial and was then abandoned.

Paré was ably seconded by his pupil Jacques Guillemeau, who translated his work into Latin, and at a later period himself wrote a treatise on midwifery. An English translation of it was published in 1612 with the title Childbirth; or, The Happy Delivery of Women.

In 1552, Paré was accepted into royal service of the Valois Dynasty under Henry II; he was however unable to cure the king's fatal blow to the head, which he received during a tournament in 1559. Paré stayed in the service of the kings of France to the end of his life in 1590, ultimately serving Henry II, Francis II, Charles IX, and Henry III.

According to Henri IV's chief minister Sully, Paré was a Huguenot and on 24 August 1572, the day of the St. Bartholomew's Day Massacre, Paré's life was saved when King Charles IX locked him in a clothes closet. He died in Paris on 20 December 1590 from natural causes in his 80th year, and is buried at the church of Saint André-des-Arts. While there is evidence that Paré was sympathetic to the Huguenot cause, he seems to have kept up the appearance of being Catholic to avoid danger: he was twice married, had his children baptized, and was buried according to the Catholic faith.

A collection of Paré's works (he published these separately throughout his life, based on his experiences treating soldiers on the battlefield) was published at Paris in 1575. They were frequently reprinted, several editions appeared in German and Dutch, and among the English translations was that of Thomas Johnson (1634).

== Bezoar stone experiment ==
In 1567, Ambroise Paré described an experiment to test the properties of bezoar stones. At the time, the stones were commonly believed to be able to cure the effects of any poison, but Paré believed this to be impossible. It happened that a cook at Paré's court was caught stealing fine silver cutlery, and was condemned to be hanged. The cook agreed to be poisoned instead, on the condition that he would be given a bezoar straight after the poison and go free in case he survived. The stone did not cure him, and he died in agony seven hours after being poisoned. Thus Paré had proved that bezoars could not cure all poisons.

== Forensics ==
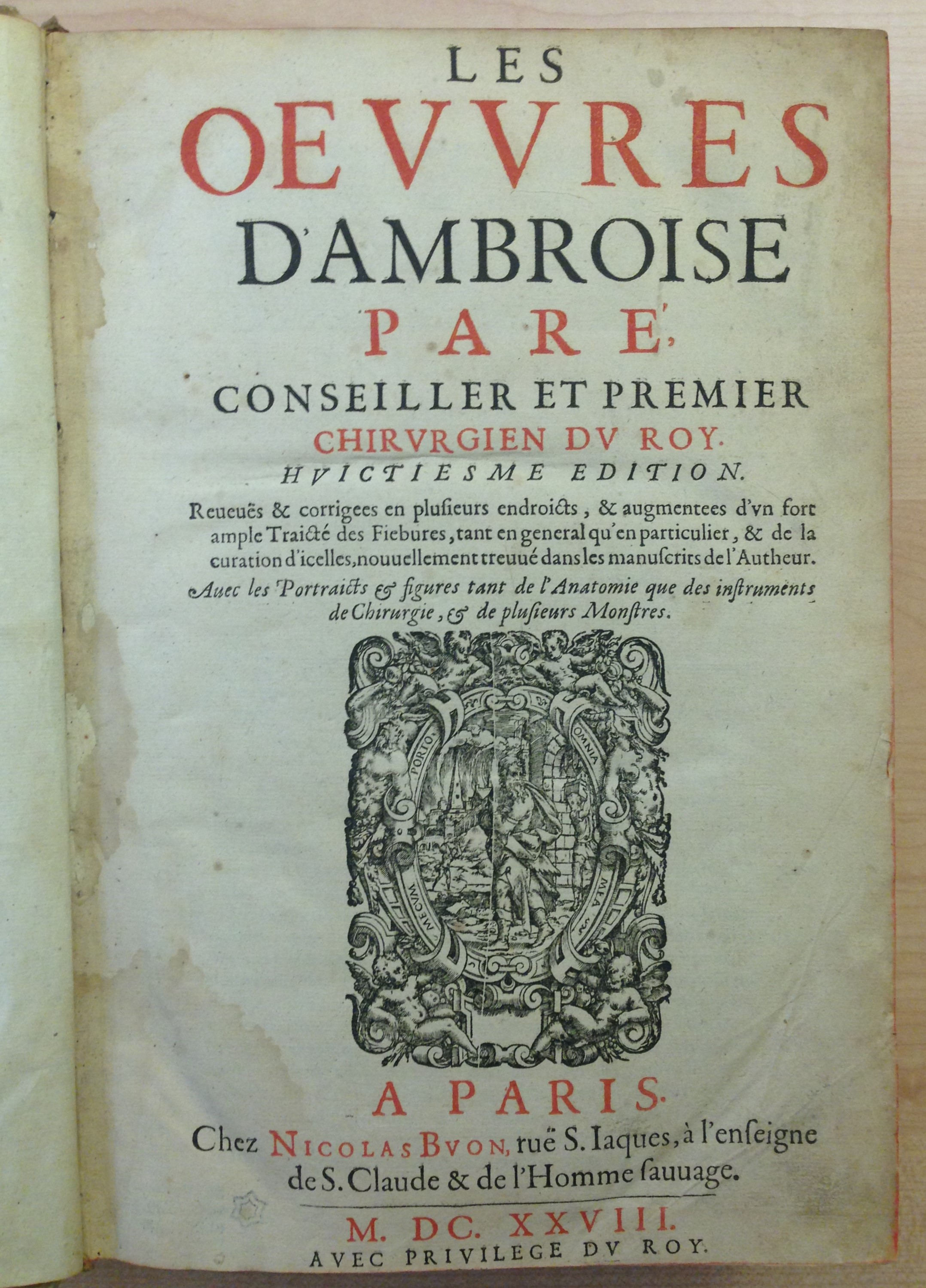
Frontispiece of Oeuvres D'Ambroise Paré, 1628

Paré's writings further include the results of his methodical studies on the effects of violent death on internal organs. He also created and wrote, Reports in Court, a procedure on the writing of legal reports in relation to medicine. His writings and instructions are known as the beginning of modern forensic pathology.

== Prostheses ==
Paré contributed both to the practice of surgical amputation and the design of limb prostheses. He also invented some ocular prostheses, making artificial eyes from enameled gold, silver, porcelain and glass.

== Honours ==
Asteroid 259344 Paré, discovered by French amateur astronomer Bernard Christophe in 2003, was named in his memory. The official naming citation was published by the Minor Planet Center on 14 February 2014 (M.P.C. 87142).

== See also ==
- Louis Duret
- Clinique Ambroise Paré
- Cagot
