= Mauriceau–Smellie–Veit maneuver =

Obstetric or emergent medical maneuver utilized in cases of breech delivery

Mauriceau–Smellie–Veit maneuver or Mauriceau maneuver (named after François Mauriceau, William Smellie and Gustav Veit) is an obstetric or emergent medical maneuver utilized in cases of breech delivery. This procedure entails suprapubic pressure by one obstetrician on the mother/uterus, while another obstetrician inserts left hand in vagina, palpating the fetal maxilla using the index and middle finger and gently pressing on the maxilla, bringing the neck to a moderate flexion. The left hand's palm should rest against the fetus' chest, while the right hand can grab either shoulder of the fetus and pull in the direction of the fetus' pelvis. The combined neck flexion, traction on the fetus toward the hip/pelvis, and the suprapubic pressure on the mother/uterus allows for delivery of the head of a breech infant, granted prior breech delivery steps are followed and the infant's occipitus is rotated/facing anteriorly relative to the mother.
