= Podalic version =

Obstetric procedure

Podalic version is an obstetric procedure wherein the fetus is turned within the womb such that one or both feet present through the cervix during childbirth. It is used most often in cases where the fetus lies transversely or in another abnormal position in the womb. In modern medicine, abnormal lies are increasingly delivered via Caesarean section. According to Gabbe, "There is no place for internal podalic version and breech extraction in the management of transverse or oblique lie or unstable presentation in singleton pregnancies because of the unacceptably high rate of fetal and maternal complications."

Podalic version has a long history spanning back to Hippocrates. It fell out of favor over the centuries until revived by Ambroise Paré in the 16th century.

• Internal podalic version comprises a series of manoeuvres performed prior to breech extraction to deliver a fetus with a persistent transverse or oblique lie in the second stage of labour.

• It is most commonly employed for the delivery of a second twin after the vaginal birth of the first and can expedite delivery in the case of profound bradycardia.

• Caesarean section for the delivery of the second baby in these circumstances is an increasingly common alternative approach but is associated with its own physical and emotional morbidities and can cause undue delay in delivery.

== Types ==
Podalic version may be external or internal.
