= Blankenberg, Thuringia =

Blankenberg
- Ortsteil of Rosenthal am Rennsteig
- Coat of arms
- Interactive map of Blankenberg
- Location within Germany Location within Thuringia
- Coordinates: 50°24′N 11°43′E
- Country: Germany
- State: Thuringia
- District: Saale-Orla-Kreis
- Municipality: Rosenthal am Rennsteig

Area
  - Total: 3.71 km^{2} (1.43 sq mi)
- Elevation: 420–555 m (1,378–1,821 ft)

Population (2017-12-31)
  - Total: 902
  - Density: 243/km^{2} (630/sq mi)
- Time zone: UTC+01:00 (CET)
  - Summer (DST): UTC+02:00 (CEST)
- Postal codes: 07366
- Dialling codes: 036642
- Website: www.gemeinde-blankenberg.de

Blankenberg (German pronunciation: [ˈblaŋkn̩ˌbɛʁk]) is a village and a former municipality in the district Saale-Orla-Kreis, in Thuringia, Germany. Since 1 January 2019, it is part of the municipality Rosenthal am Rennsteig.

== History ==
Within the German Empire (1871-1918), Blankenberg was part of the Prussian Province of Saxony.
