= Max Hofmeier =

German gynecologist (1854–1927)

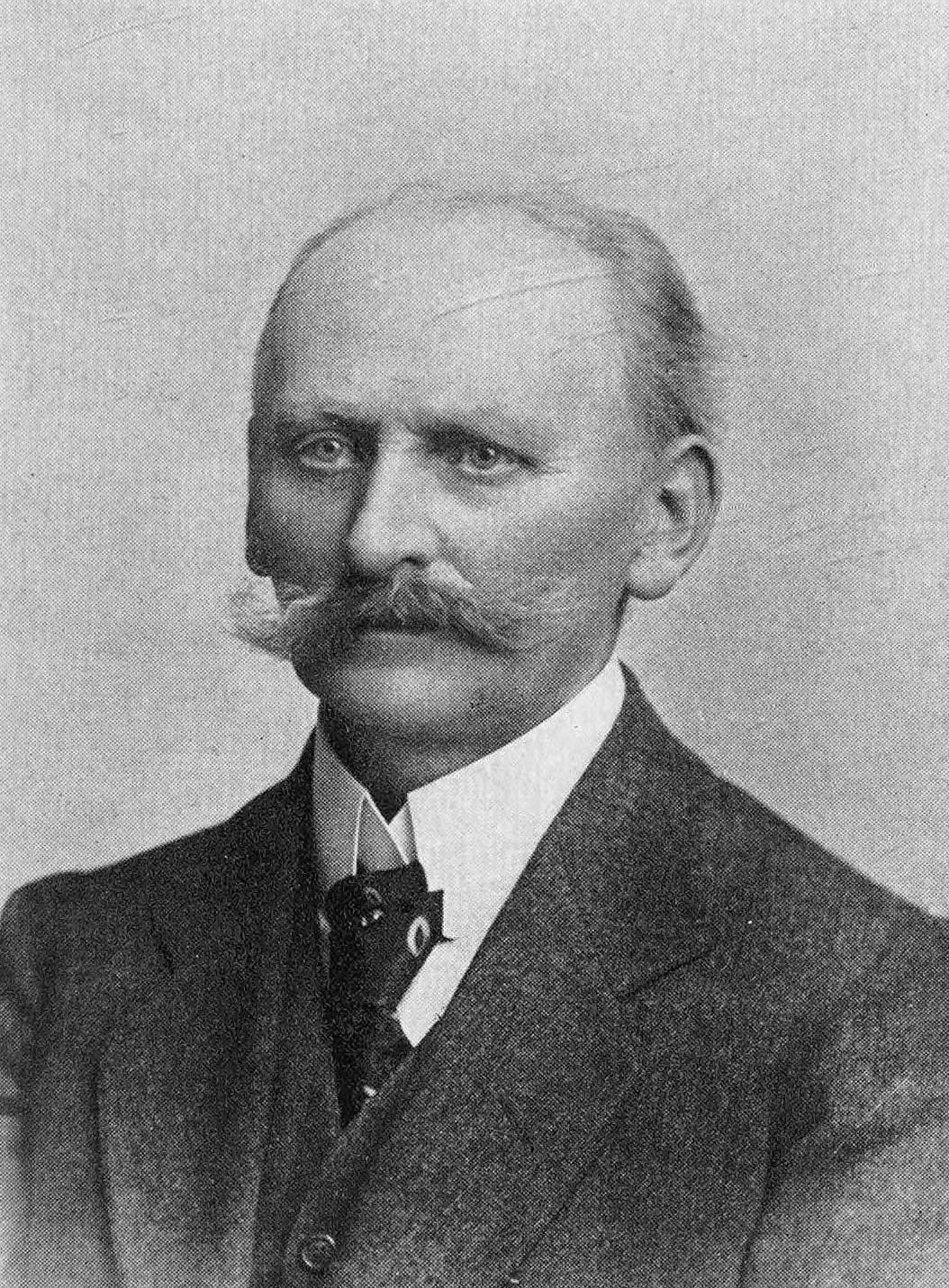
Max Hofmeier (1854-1927)

Max Friedrich Adolph Hofmeier (28 January 1854 in Zudar on the island of Rügen – 3 April 1927) was a German gynecologist.

He studied medicine at the universities of Würzburg, Freiburg and Greifswald, obtaining his doctorate in 1876. As a student he was influenced by Alfred Hegar (1830–1914) and Hugo Pernice (1829–1901).

Following graduation, he worked as an assistant in Greifswald, shortly afterwards relocating to Berlin as an assistant at the obstetrics clinic of Karl Schroeder (1838–1887). In 1887 he became a full professor of OB/GYN at the University of Giessen, followed by a directorship the following year at Würzburg as successor to Friedrich Wilhelm von Scanzoni (1821–1891) at the university Frauenklinik.

== Written works ==
Hofmeier was scientific editor of the twelfth edition of Carl Schroeder's Handbuch der Krankheiten der weiblichen Geschlechtsorgane (1898). The following are some of his principal works:

- Die Myotomie, 1884 – Myotomy.
- Grundriss der gynäkologischen Operationen (1888, fourth edition 1905) – Outline of gynecological operations.
- Handbuch der Frauenkrankheiten, 1908 – Textbook of gynecological diseases.
