= Percy Gabbe =

Australian rugby league footballer

Personal information
- Full name: Percy William Gabbe
- Born: 14 July 1902; Queensland, Australia
- Died: 24 October 1964 (aged 62); Little Bay, New South Wales, Australia

Playing information
- Position: Fullback
Club
Years	Team	Pld	T	G	FG	P
1923–26	St. George	26	2	0	0	6
Representative
Years	Team	Pld	T	G	FG	P
1923	Metropolis	1	0	0	0	0
- Source: As of 10 July 2019

Percy William Gabbe (1902-1964) was an Australian rugby league footballer who played in the 1920s.

== Playing career ==
Perc Gabbe played with the St. George club for four seasons and was a fullback. He retired in 1926.

Gabbe was also a handy cricketer for the Kogarah Cricket Club and enjoyed golf at Bexley Golf Club until his death.

Perc Gabbe died on 24 October 1964.
