= Neundorf bei Lobenstein =

Neundorf
- Ortsteil of Rosenthal am Rennsteig
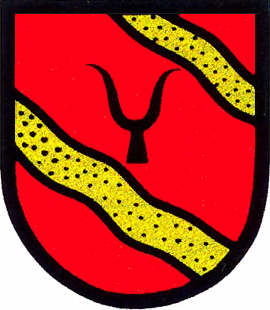
- Coat of arms
- Interactive map of Neundorf
- Location within Germany Location within Thuringia
- Coordinates: 50°26′N 11°36′E
- Country: Germany
- State: Thuringia
- District: Saale-Orla-Kreis
- Municipality: Rosenthal am Rennsteig

Area
  - Total: 11.81 km^{2} (4.56 sq mi)
- Elevation: 650 m (2,130 ft)

Population (2017-12-31)
  - Total: 553
  - Density: 46.8/km^{2} (121/sq mi)
- Time zone: UTC+01:00 (CET)
  - Summer (DST): UTC+02:00 (CEST)
- Postal codes: 07356
- Dialling codes: 036651
- Website: www.gemeinde-neundorf.de

Neundorf (bei Lobenstein) (German pronunciation: [ˈnɔʏndɔʁf], lit. 'Neundorf near Lobenstein') is a village and a former municipality in the district Saale-Orla-Kreis, in Thuringia, Germany. Since 1 January 2019, it is part of the municipality Rosenthal am Rennsteig.
