= Schlegel, Thuringia =

Schlegel
- Ortsteil of Rosenthal am Rennsteig
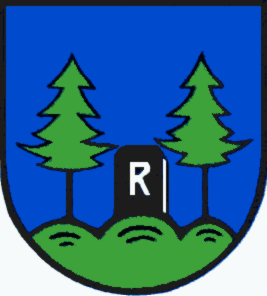
- Coat of arms
- Interactive map of Schlegel
- Location within Germany Location within Thuringia
- Coordinates: 50°24′17″N 11°37′12″E
- Country: Germany
- State: Thuringia
- District: Saale-Orla-Kreis
- Municipality: Rosenthal am Rennsteig

Area
  - Total: 12.29 km^{2} (4.75 sq mi)
- Elevation: 620 m (2,030 ft)

Population (2017-12-31)
  - Total: 299
  - Density: 24.3/km^{2} (63.0/sq mi)
- Time zone: UTC+01:00 (CET)
  - Summer (DST): UTC+02:00 (CEST)
- Postal codes: 07366
- Dialling codes: 036642, 036651
- Vehicle registration: SOK

Schlegel (German pronunciation: [ˈʃleːɡl̩]) is a village and a former municipality in the district Saale-Orla-Kreis, in Thuringia, Germany. Since 1 January 2019, it is part of the municipality Rosenthal am Rennsteig. Olympian Harry Köcher was born here.

== History ==
Schlegel was first documented on June 24, 1254, and Seibis in 1500.

On July 1, 1950, the previously independent municipality of Seibis became a district of Schlegel.
