= Pottiga =

- Ortsteil of Rosenthal am Rennsteig
- Interactive map of Pottiga
- Location within Germany Location within Thuringia
- Coordinates: 50°25′N 11°45′E
- Country: Germany
- State: Thuringia
- District: Saale-Orla-Kreis
- Municipality: Rosenthal am Rennsteig

Area
  - Total: 7.6 km^{2} (2.9 sq mi)
- Elevation: 500 m (1,600 ft)

Population (2017-12-31)
  - Total: 397
  - Density: 52/km^{2} (140/sq mi)
- Time zone: UTC+01:00 (CET)
  - Summer (DST): UTC+02:00 (CEST)
- Postal codes: 07366
- Dialling codes: 036642
- Website: www.gemeinde-pottiga.de

Pottiga (German pronunciation: [ˈpɔtɪɡaː]) is a village and a former municipality in the district Saale-Orla-Kreis, in Thuringia, Germany. Since 1 January 2019, it is part of the municipality Rosenthal am Rennsteig.
