= Steven Gabbe =

American medical researcher

Steven G. Gabbe is an American obstetrician-gynecologist, specializing in complications of pregnancy. He is the former Chief Executive Officer at The Ohio State University Medical Center and Senior Vice President for Health Sciences. He is the namesake of Gabbe College, one of the four academic colleges of the Vanderbilt University School of Medicine, of which he formerly served as dean.

== Career ==
On April 4, 2008, Gabbe was appointed chief executive officer of the Ohio State University Medical Center and Senior Vice President of Health Sciences at Ohio State University by President Gordon Gee. Gabbe was at Ohio State University for nine years as a professor and chairman of obstetrics and gynecology in The Ohio State University College of Medicine.

He left in 1996 for the University of Washington and was recruited to Vanderbilt as Dean of the Vanderbilt School of Medicine by former Vanderbilt Chancellor Gordon Gee in March 2001.

He has authored over 175 research articles, and is the first author of the textbook, Obstetrics: Normal and Problem Pregnancies (Elsevier).

He was elected a member of the Institute of Medicine of the United States National Academy of Sciences in 1998.

== Selected works ==
=== Books ===
- Gabbe S, et al.. Obstetrics: Normal and Problem Pregnancies, 5th edn (Elsevier; 2007) (ISBN 0-443-06930-1)

=== Research articles ===
- Landon, MB; et al. (2004). "Maternal and perinatal outcomes associated with a trial of labor after prior cesarean delivery". N Engl J Med. 351 (25): 2581–2589. doi:10.1056/NEJMoa040405. PMID 15598960.
