= Birkenhügel =

- Ortsteil of Rosenthal am Rennsteig
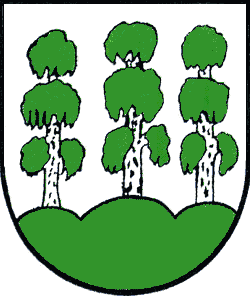
- Coat of arms
- Interactive map of Birkenhügel
- Location within Germany Location within Thuringia
- Coordinates: 50°26′N 11°45′E
- Country: Germany
- State: Thuringia
- District: Saale-Orla-Kreis
- Municipality: Rosenthal am Rennsteig

Area
  - Total: 5.55 km^{2} (2.14 sq mi)
- Elevation: 536 m (1,759 ft)

Population (2017-12-31)
  - Total: 364
  - Density: 65.6/km^{2} (170/sq mi)
- Time zone: UTC+01:00 (CET)
  - Summer (DST): UTC+02:00 (CEST)
- Postal codes: 07366
- Dialling codes: 036642
- Website: www.gemeinde-birkenhuegel.de

Birkenhügel (German pronunciation: [ˈbɪʁkn̩ˌhyːɡl̩]) is a village and a former municipality in the district Saale-Orla-Kreis, in Thuringia, Germany. Since 1 January 2019, it is part of the municipality Rosenthal am Rennsteig.
