= Harra =

- Ortsteil of Rosenthal am Rennsteig
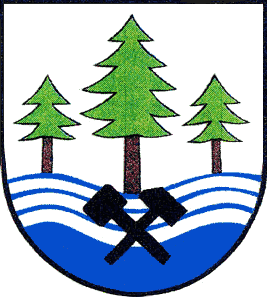
- Coat of arms
- Interactive map of Harra
- Location within Germany Location within Thuringia
- Coordinates: 50°25′4″N 11°41′1″E
- Country: Germany
- State: Thuringia
- District: Saale-Orla-Kreis
- Municipality: Rosenthal am Rennsteig

Area
  - Total: 14 km^{2} (5.4 sq mi)
- Elevation: 444 m (1,457 ft)

Population (2017-12-31)
  - Total: 828
  - Density: 59/km^{2} (150/sq mi)
- Time zone: UTC+01:00 (CET)
  - Summer (DST): UTC+02:00 (CEST)
- Postal codes: 07366
- Dialling codes: 036642
- Vehicle registration: SOK
- Website: www.gemeinde-harra.de

Harra (German pronunciation: [ˈhaʁa]) is a village and a former municipality in the district Saale-Orla-Kreis, in Thuringia, Germany. Since 1 January 2019, it is part of the municipality Rosenthal am Rennsteig.
