= Anton Friedrich Hohl =

German professor of obstetrics

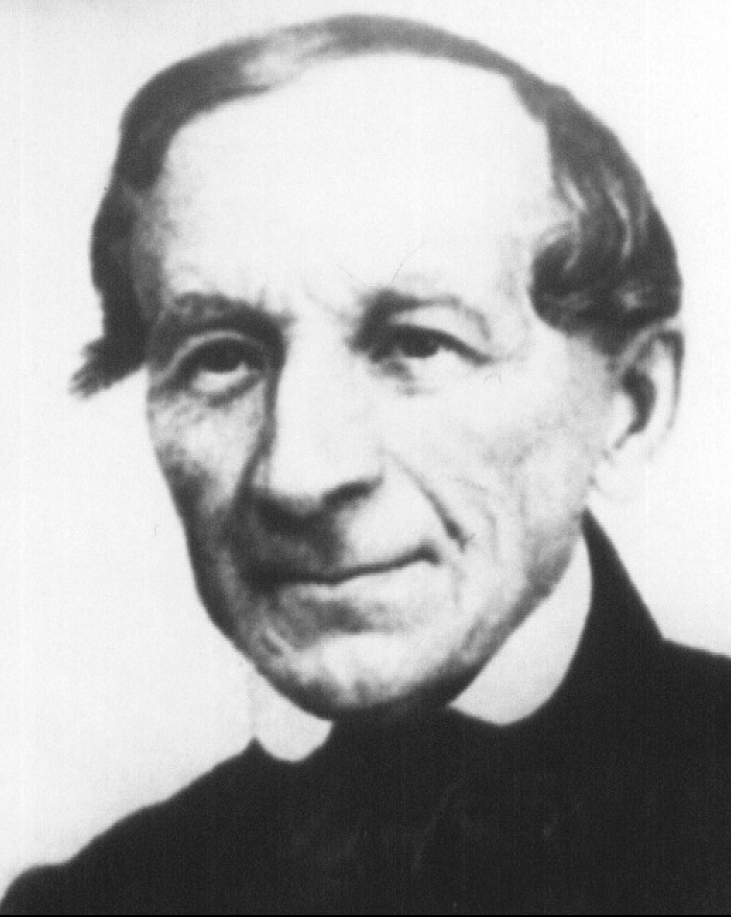
Anton Friedrich Hohl (1789-1862)

Anton Friedrich Hohl (17 November 1789–23 January 1862) was a German professor of obstetrics born in Lobenstein.

He studied law at the University of Leipzig, and following graduation opened a law practice in his home town of Lobenstein. In 1824 he was able procure sufficient funds to study medicine. In 1827 he obtained his medical doctorate at Halle an der Saale with a dissertation on microcephaly. This thesis was based on a specimen from the teratological collection of Johann Friedrich Meckel (1781-1833). In 1834 Hohl became a full professor of obstetrics at Halle.

Hohl published numerous works in the field of obstetrics, including an influential textbook titled Lehrbuch der Geburtshülfe mit Einschluss der geburtshülflichen Operationen und der gerichtlichen Geburtshülfe. (Textbook of Obstetrics with the Inclusion of Obstetric Operations and Forensic Obstetrics). In 1852 he was the first physician to describe agenesis of the lower spine. Earlier in his career he provided a description for design of a fetal stethoscope (1834).

== Selected publications ==
- De Microcephalia. Halle 1830. (Dissertation)
- De Aneurysmatis, eorum medendi manuumque opera sanandi ratione. Orphanotropheum, Halle 1830. (Habilitation)
- Die Geburtshülfliche Exploration. (Obstetrical exploration) Verlag der Buchhandlung des Waisenhauses, Halle 1833–1834, two volumes
- Vorträge über die Geburt des Menschen. Waisenhaus, Halle 1845.
- Die Geburten missgestalteter, kranker und todter Kinder. Waisenhaus, Halle 1850.
- Zur Pathologie des Beckens. (Pathology of the pelvis); Engelmann, Leipzig 1852.
- Lehrbuch der Geburtshülfe mit Einschluss der geburtshülflichen Operationen und der gerichtlichen Geburtshülfe. Engelmann, Leipzig 1855
