= Radar Doppler Multifunction =

Type of multimode aircraft radar

The RDM (Radar Doppler Multifunction), also known as the Cyrano 5, is a French multimode pulse-Doppler radar developed by Thomson-CSF (now Thales) for export variants and early French models of the Mirage 2000 fighter aircraft. It is an evolution of the Cyrano IV installed on the Mirage F-1 and in turn was developed into the RDI (Radar Doppler à Impulsions), a specialist air-to-air radar for French Mirage 2000 interceptors, and the multimode RDY (Radar Doppler Multitarget), which could track more targets at a time and added further air-to-ground modes.

== History ==
The first prototype of the RDM flew in January 1980 and production deliveries began in early 1983. Thomson funded development of the RDM from the Cyrano IV at a cost of FFr350m (~US$50m); the RDI air intercept derivative was funded by the French government. The RDM was intended for export Mirage 2000's and the first 50 for the French Air Force; the remaining 150 French Mirage 2000C's would have the RDI. In the end only 37 aircraft were fitted with the RDM, the first production RDI was delivered in December 1986. The two radars are interchangeable in the aircraft but have little in common electronically; the biggest difference is that the RDI increases the look-down/shoot-down range in pulse doppler mode from 20 nautical miles (37 km) to 50 nmi (93 km), and supports the improved Super 530D missile. Allegedly the French Air Force would have preferred to wait until the RDI was ready and have an all-RDI fleet, but the government insisted that they take aircraft with RDM so that it could be marketed abroad as the front-line radar of France.

== Design ==
RDM operates in the X-band with a coherent travelling-wave-tube transmitter and an inverted-Cassegrain antenna 655 mm (25.8 in) in diameter. The RDM operates in air defence/air superiority, strike and air-to-sea modes. In the air-to-air role, the system can look up or down, range while searching, track-while-scan, provide continuous tracking, generate aiming signals for air combat and compute attack and firing envelopes. For the strike role it provides real-beam ground-mapping, navigation updating, contour-mapping, terrain-avoidance, blind let-down, air-to-ground ranging and Ground Moving Target Indication (GMTI).

In the maritime role it provides long-range search, track-while-scan and continuous tracking and can designate targets for active missiles. For air-to-air combat, the RDM provides a 120° cone of coverage, the antenna scanning at either 50 or 100°/s, with ±60, ±30 or ±15° scan. For air-to-air gun attacks, the 3.5° beam can be locked to the target at up to 19 km (10 nmi) range, with automatic tracking within the head-up display field of view, or in a 'super-search' area, or in a vertical search mode. Options include a Continuous Wave Illuminator (CWI) and Doppler Beam Sharpening (DBS). Comprehensive Electronic Counter-Countermeasures (ECCM) are incorporated.

The manufacturers claim that RDM will detect 90% of 5 m^{2} RCS fighter-sized targets out to 50 nmi (93 km) in clear air using a four-bar search pattern over 120° in azimuth, and 60 nmi (111 km) with a single-bar pattern over 30° in azimuth, dropping to 20 nmi (37 km) in pulse-Doppler look-down mode. RDI uses a higher pulse-repetition frequency for its dedicated interception role, increasing clear-air range to around 66 nmi (122 km) and 50 nmi (93 km) is possible in look-down mode.

== See also ==
- AI.24 Foxhunter - contemporary British radar on the Tornado F3
- AN/APG-63 radar family - contemporary US radar on the F-15 Eagle
- RBE2 - Radar à Balayage Electronique 2, radar on the Rafale
