= Dassault Mirage 2000 =

French jet fighter aircraft

Mirage 2000
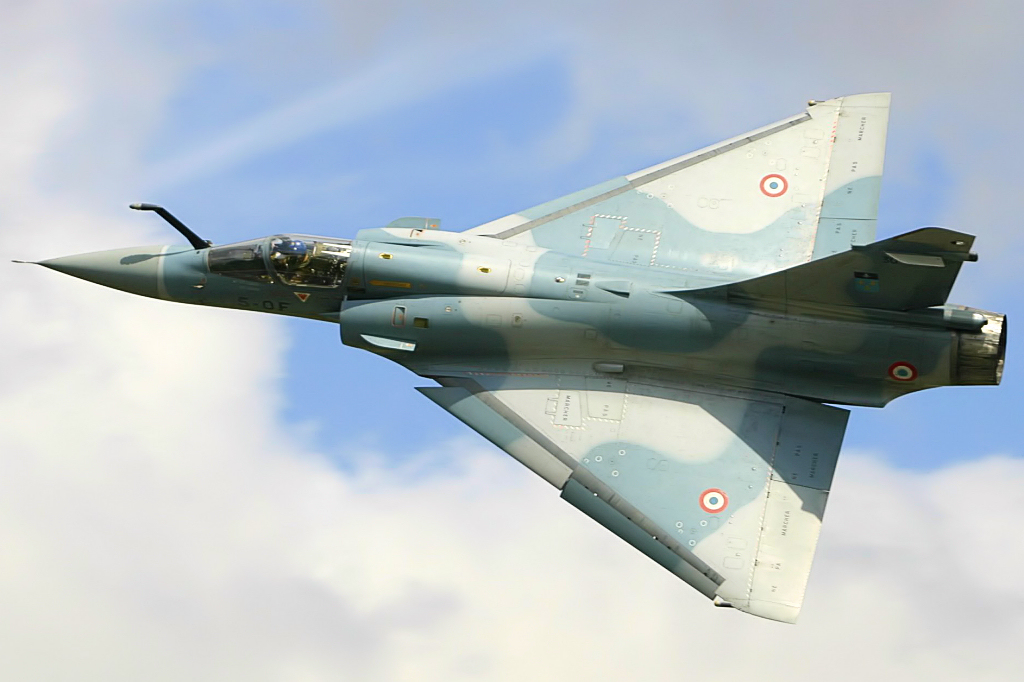
- French Mirage 2000 at RIAT 2004

General information
- Type: Multirole fighter aircraft
- National origin: France
- Manufacturer: Dassault Aviation
- Status: In service
- Primary users: French Air and Space Force United Arab Emirates Air Force; Republic of China Air Force; Indian Air Force
- Number built: 601

History
- Manufactured: 1978–2007
- Introduction date: July 1984
- First flight: 10 March 1978
- Variant: Dassault Mirage 2000N/2000D
- Developed into: Dassault Mirage 4000

The Dassault Mirage 2000 is a multirole, single-engine, delta wing, fourth-generation jet fighter designed and produced by the French aircraft manufacturer Dassault Aviation.

Work on what would become the Mirage 2000 originated with the "Delta 1000" project launched in 1972. In contrast to other projects that Dassault had recently worked on, such as the Anglo-French Variable Geometry (AFVG) and Mirage G, the Delta 1000 was an interceptor first and a strike aircraft second while retaining a more affordable single engine configuration. In response to feedback from the French Air Force (Armée de l'air), which sought a lightweight fighter to replace the Mirage III for the French Air Force (Armée de l'air), the Delta 2000 proposal was redesigned into the Mirage 2000, for which the service issued requirements that matched Dassault's performance estimates in March 1976. On 10 March 1978, only 27 months after the programme was cleared to proceed, the first prototype conducted its maiden flight, during which the aircraft went supersonic. A total of three prototypes and one single-seat demonstrator were produced for the flight test programme. On 20 November 1982, the first production Mirage 2000C (C for chasseur, "fighter") made its first flight; deliveries commenced during the following year.

Beyond the initial fighter model, the Mirage 2000 was adapted into a multirole aircraft comprising several distinct variants. At the behest of the Armée de l'air, it was developed into the Mirage 2000N and 2000D, the former being tasked with carrying France's airborne nuclear deterrent and the latter being a dedicated ground-attack platform. During the late 1980s, development of the improved Mirage 2000-5 was started, which became the basis of multiple export variants. The largest operator of the type is the French Air and Space Force, followed by the United Arab Emirates Air Force, the Republic of China Air Force, and the Indian Air Force. On 23 November 2007, the final Mirage 2000 produced was delivered to the Hellenic Air Force, after which the assembly line was shuttered. In excess of 600 aircraft were built; the Mirage 2000 has been in service with ten nations as of 2026.

During its service life, the Mirage 2000 has been involved in live combat on multiple occasions. French Mirage 2000s were used during the Gulf War, the Bosnian War, the Kosovo War, the War in Afghanistan, and the Syrian Civil War; the type scored the first aerial kills by any French aircraft since the Second World War. Indian Mirages 2000s were active during the Kargil War, the 2001–2002 India–Pakistan standoff, the 2020 China–India skirmishes and the 2025 India–Pakistan conflict. UAE Mirage 2000s flew in the Gulf War and the Saudi Arabian-led intervention in Yemen. The Peruvian Air Force deployed their Mirages 2000s during the Cenepa War. The Ukrainian Air Force has flown combat missions using the type during the Russo-Ukrainian war. In the 2000s, the Mirage 2000 was succeeded as the principal frontline fighter of the French Air and Space Force by the newer Dassault Rafale.

== Development ==
=== Previous projects ===
The origins of the Mirage 2000 could be traced back to 1965, when France and Britain agreed to develop the "Anglo-French Variable Geometry" (AFVG) swing-wing aircraft. Two years later, France withdrew from the project on grounds of costs, after which Britain would collaborate with West Germany and Italy to ultimately produce the Panavia Tornado. Instead, Dassault focused on its own variable-geometry aircraft, the Dassault Mirage G experimental prototype. The design was expected to materialise in the Mirage G8, which would serve as the replacement for the popular Mirage III in French Air Force (Armée de l'air AdA) service.

The Mirage 2000 started out as a secondary project tentatively named "Delta 1000" in 1972. Dassault was devoting considerable attention to the Mirage G8A, a fixed-geometry derivative of the Mirage G8 that served as the competitor to the Panavia Tornado. The Mirage G8, which was envisioned as the "Avion de Combat Futur" (ACF or Future Combat Aircraft) of the AdA, did not align with the service's conception of its future aircraft. Specifically, the AdA wanted a Mach 3 fighter, not the Mirage G8, an interdictor aircraft poor at dogfighting. As such, Dassault redesigned the Mirage G8 into the twin-engine Super Mirage G8A that would prove to be ambitious and expensive, being two and a half times the price of the Mirage F1 and over-engineered, especially compared to the General Dynamics F-16 that had just won orders from a number of European countries. Consequently, during a meeting of the National Defence Council on 18 December 1975, the Super Mirage was cancelled.

The ACF was a strike aircraft first and an interceptor second, while the Delta 2000 was the reverse. However, the single-engine Delta 2000 was considerably more affordable. At the same National Defence Council meeting, a redesignated Mirage 2000 was offered to the AdA, and three prototypes were ordered. The AdA in March 1976 issued a set of official requirements whose parameters matched those of Dassault's performance estimates of the new fighter. The aircraft's primary role was interception with a secondary ground-attack capability; the AdA had a commitment for 200 aircraft. The first aircraft was to be delivered in 1982. This was a return to the first-generation Mirages, but with several important innovations that tried to solve their shortcomings.

=== Production ===
The production of the Mirage 2000 involved three construction sites, two located in Bordeaux that specialised in different components. The wings were built at Martignas, and the fuselages were fabricated at Argenteuil (NW of Paris), with final assembly taking place at Bordeaux–Mérignac Airport. The first prototype, Mirage 2000 No. 01, though, was handbuilt at Saint-Cloud, before being moved to Dassault's Istres facility for assembly. At the hands of Jean Coureau, No. 01 conducted its maiden flight on 10 March 1978, a mere 27 months after the programme go-ahead. During the 65-minute flight, Coureau took the aircraft to Mach 1.02 without afterburner, before climbing to more than 12,000 meters and accelerating the aircraft to Mach 1.3. By the end of May, the aircraft had surpassed Mach 2 and an indicated airspeed of 1,200 kilometres per hour (650 kn). On the other end of the speed spectrum, the Mirage 2000 proved to be capable of low-speed flight, as demonstrated at the Farnborough Airshow in September 1978, during which Dassault pilot Guy Mitaux-Maurourd raised the aircraft's nose to 25° angle of attack (AoA) as the aircraft slowed to 190 km/h (100 kn). Later tests showed that the aircraft could attain 30° AoA while carrying fuel tanks and weapons.

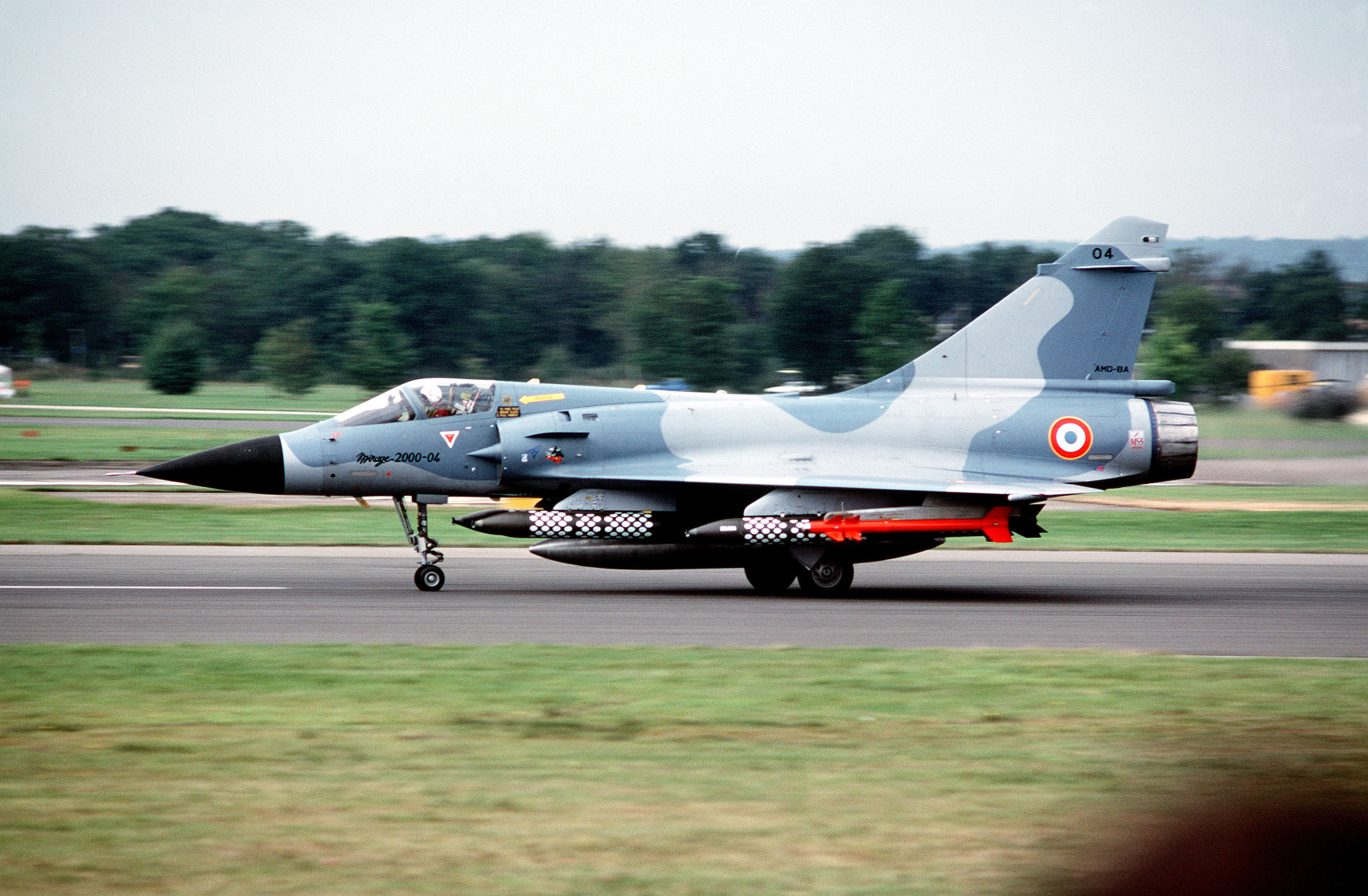
The fourth prototype of the Mirage 2000 on display at the Farnborough Airshow

In September 1978, the second prototype, No. 02, made its 50-minute first flight with Maurourd again at the controls. This aircraft was to test some of the avionics systems and the carriage of weapons. Due to a flameout while on approach, the aircraft was lost in May 1984. No. 03 made its first flight in April 1979; equipped with a complete weapons system, it was used for radar and weapons trials. After 400 hours of flight, the prototypes were sent to Centre d'Essais en Vol, flight tests centre. Although three prototypes were ordered in December 1975, Dassault constructed an additional fourth single-seat demonstrator for its own purposes, which embodied lessons on the earlier aircraft, namely the reduction in fin height and an increased fin sweep, redesigned air inlets, and an FBW system. The only dual-seat Mirage 2000B of the test programme first flew on 11 October 1980.

On 20 November 1982, the first production Mirage 2000C (C for chasseur, "fighter") made its first flight. Deliveries to the AdA began in 1983. The first 37 Mirage 2000Cs delivered were fitted with the Thomson-CSF Radar Doppler Multifunction (RDM), and were powered by the SNECMA M53-5 turbofan engine. The 38th Mirage 2000C had an upgraded SNECMA M53-P2 turbofan engine. The Radar Doppler à Impulsion (RDI) built for the Mirage 2000C entered service in 1987, which has a much improved range of about 150 km, and is linked to Matra Super 530D missiles, which are measurably improved compared to the older Super 530F. The aircraft's Look-down/shoot-down capabilities are much improved, as well, although this radar is not usually used for air-to-surface roles.

=== Strike derivatives ===
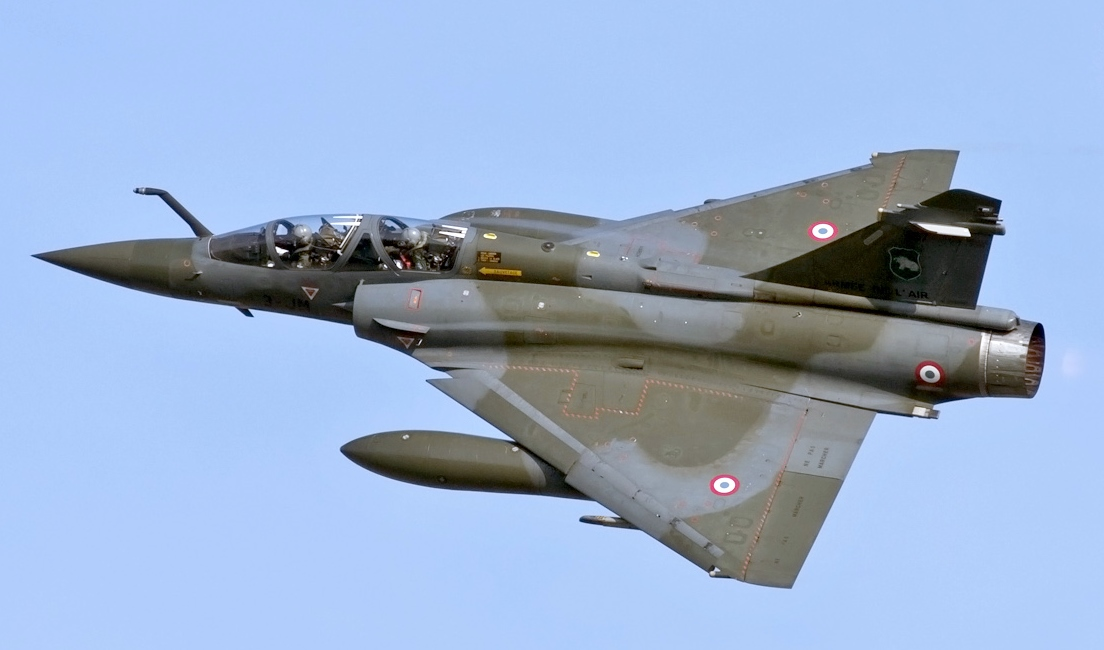
Dassault Mirage 2000D

The Mirage 2000N is a dedicated nuclear-strike variant, which was intended to carry the Air-Sol Moyenne Portée (ASMP) nuclear standoff missile. Flight tests of the first of two prototypes, Mirage 2000N 01 (eighth Mirage 2000) began on 3 February 1983. During the 65-minute flight, the aircraft reached a speed of Mach 1.5. The variant entered operational service in 1988, initially operating from Luxeuil Air Base with the 4^{e} Escadre de Chasse.

Closely derived from the Mirage 2000N is a dedicated conventional attack variant designated Mirage 2000D. Initial flight of the Mirage 2000D prototype, a modified Mirage 2000N prototype, was on 19 February 1991. The first flight of a production aircraft occurred 31 March 1993, and service introduction followed in April 1995. Seventy-five Mirage 2000Ns and eighty-six Mirage 2000Ds were manufactured, respectively.

=== Further development ===
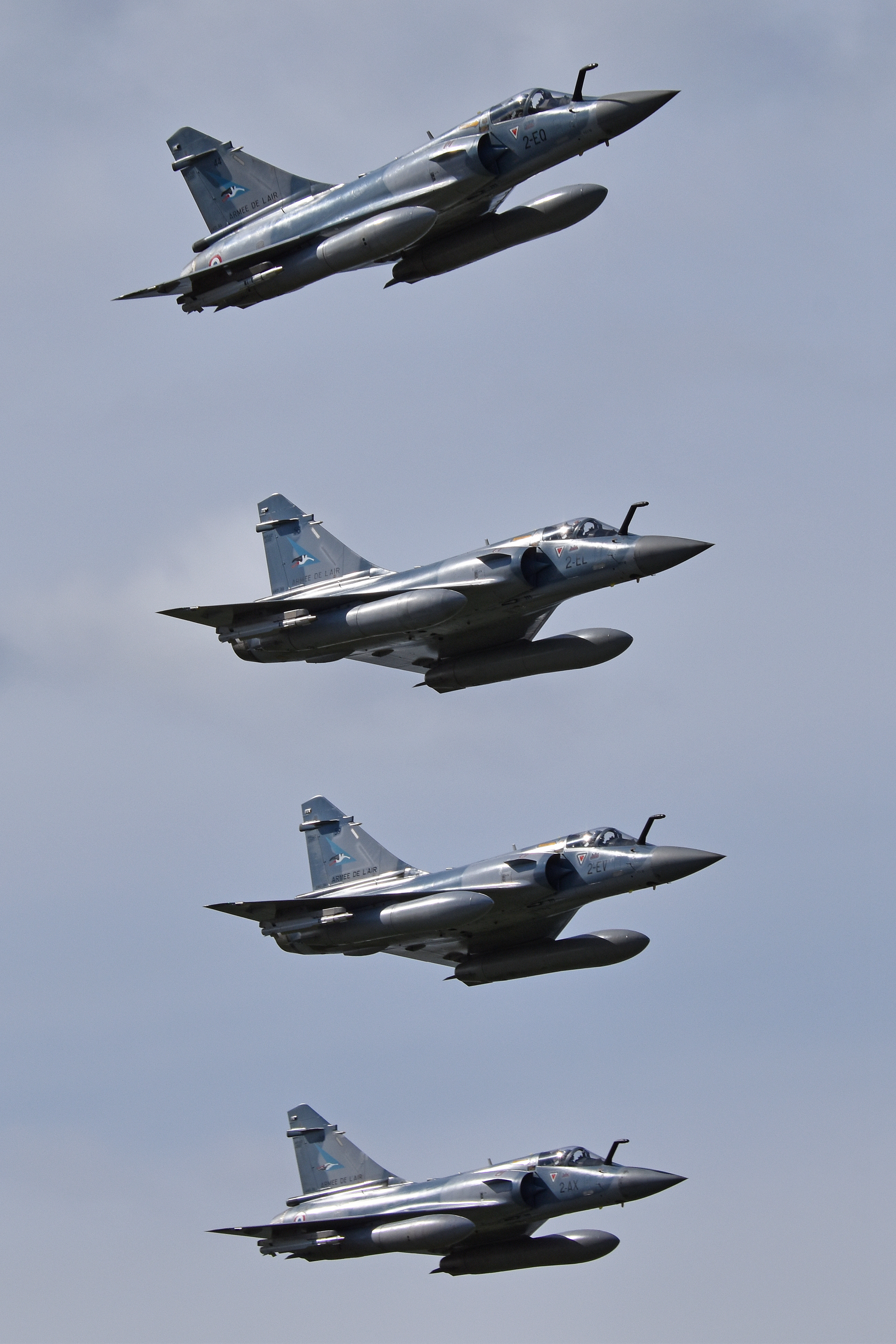
Mirage 2000-5F

By the late 1980s, the Mirage 2000 was beginning to age compared with the latest models of F-16 fighters. In particular, attention was drawn to the Mirage 2000's inability to engage multiple targets simultaneously, and the small load of air-to-air missiles it could carry. Consequently, Dassault in April 1989 announced that with the cooperation of Thomson-CSF, it would be working on a privately funded update of the Mirage 2000C, which was to be named the Mirage 2000-5. A two-seat Mirage 2000B prototype was extensively modified as the first Mirage 2000-5 prototype, and it first flew on 24 October 1990. A Mirage 2000C prototype was also reworked to a similar standard, making its initial flight on 27 April 1991. The first frontline aircraft variant to have been designed specifically in response to the export market, Taiwan was the first country to order the type in 1992, followed by Qatar in 1994. The type was first delivered in 1996 and entered service in 1997.

Domestically, Dassault needed an order from the AdA to help promote foreign sales, and in 1993, the AdA decided to upgrade 37 of their existing Mirage 2000s to the 2000-5 specification as a stopgap before the arrival of the Rafale in AdA service. The upgraded aircraft were redesignated Mirage 2000-5F, and became operational in 2000. They retained the old countermeasures system with the Serval/Sabre/Spirale units and did not receive the ICMS 2 system. A two-seat version was developed, as well, whose rear seat has a heads-up display, but not an associated head-level display, and lacks a built-in cannon, although cannon pods can be carried.

At the urging of the United Arab Emirates, Dassault worked on a further modification of the Mirage 2000-5. Initially dubbed Mirage 2000-9, this variant had the upgrade of the radar and the associated avionics, the change of weapons configuration, and the extension of range.

The last Mirage 2000 was delivered on 23 November 2007 to the Hellenic Air Force; afterwards, the production line was shut down.

== Design ==
=== Overview ===
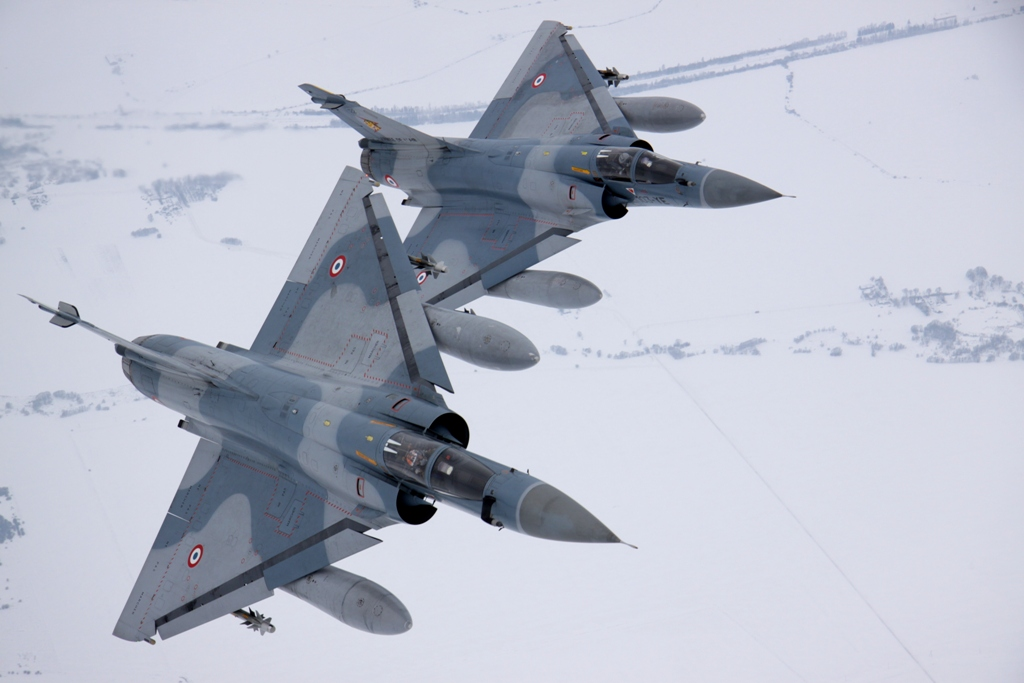
Mirage 2000Cs showing its delta wing layout

The Mirage 2000 is a supersonic combat aircraft of metal construction that shares the general delta-wing layout with the Mirage III, yet incorporates avionics advances that help overcome the latter's aerodynamic limitations. The aircraft's low-set, thin wing has a leading-edge sweep back of 58° and a trailing-edge forward sweep of 3.5°. The control surfaces on the wings consist of four elevons and four leading edge slats. A feature of the delta wing is that it offers a comparatively large wing area for a particular design, thereby reducing the wing loading. The wing on a Mirage 2000 has an area of 41 m^{2}, giving it a wing loading of some 380 kg/m^{2} (77 lb/ft^{2}) at a takeoff weight of 15,000 kg (33,000 lb), making it considerably more manoeuvrable than the F-15 and the similarly sized F-16, which has a wing loading of 540 kg/m^{2} (110 lb/ft^{2}). At normal combat load, however, the wing loading reduces to 220 kg/m^{2} (45 lb/ft^{2}). One related advantage of the delta-wing design, and especially the Mirage 2000's blending of the wing root and engine, is that it could accommodate more fuel, as the aircraft's internal fuel tanks can carry 3,950 L (8,000 L maximum) of fuel, up more than 750L over the Mirage III. The aircraft's fuselage is of traditional monocoque construction composed almost entirely of metal. The fuselage has been area-ruled to maintain a constant cross-sectional area along with the delta wing to minimise drag.

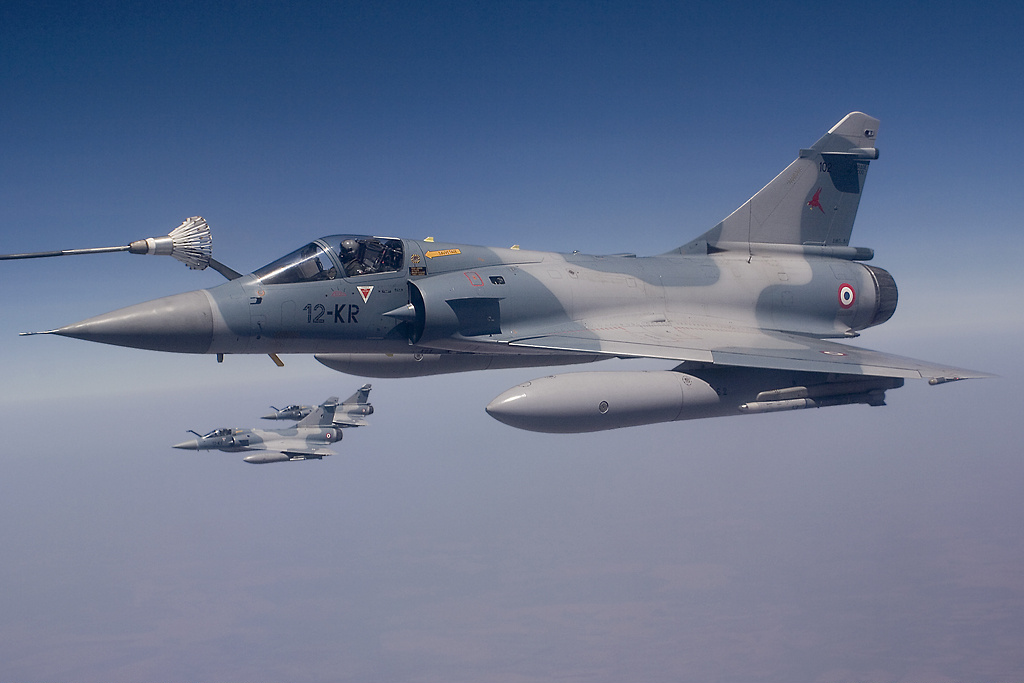
French Air Force Mirage 2000C with an aerial refueling probe attached

The aircraft uses retractable tricycle landing gear by Messier-Dowty, with twin nosewheels and a single wheel on each main gear. A runway tailhook or a fairing for a brake parachute can be fitted under the tail, which can operate in conjunction with the landing gear's carbon brakes to shorten landing distances. A removable refueling probe can be attached in front of the cockpit, offset slightly to the right of centre.

An airbrake is fitted above and below each wing in an arrangement very similar to that of the Mirage III. A noticeably taller tailfin allows the pilot to retain control at AoAs past 25°, assisted by the small strakes mounted along each air intake. The shape and size of these air intakes is sufficient to provide ample air flow even when the aircraft is being flown at high AoAs. Some composites have been used for elements of the aircraft, including the fins, rudder, elevons, and various access panels, resulting in an overall weight saving of roughly 100 kg. The Mirage 2000 has been noted for its superb handling, especially given its delta-wing design.

Dassault engineers have embedded into the design a certain degree of relaxed stability as the centre of gravity, or neutral point, is placed ahead of the centre of pressure, enhancing maneuverability. It incorporates negative stability and fly-by-wire controls with four analog computers. As first demonstrated at the 1978 Farnborough Airshow, such designs, as well as the use of computer-controlled dynamic controls were capable of overcoming the delta-wing shortcomings related to poor low-speed control, while retaining the advantages, such as low drag, low radar cross section, ideal high-speed aerodynamics, and large internal volume, as well as simplicity, provided by the absence of horizontal tail surfaces.

Its aircraft flight control system is fly-by-wire, with two distinct modes of operation. The first allows for unrestricted operations within its full allowed flight envelope, and is used when carrying only air-to-air weapons. The second is used when carrying fuel tanks, air-to-ground munitions, or a mix of both. This second mode functions as a g-limiter, preventing heavier munitions from damaging the pylons that they are mounted on, and preventing them from potentially being pulled off of the pylons by excessive G-force.

=== Cockpit ===
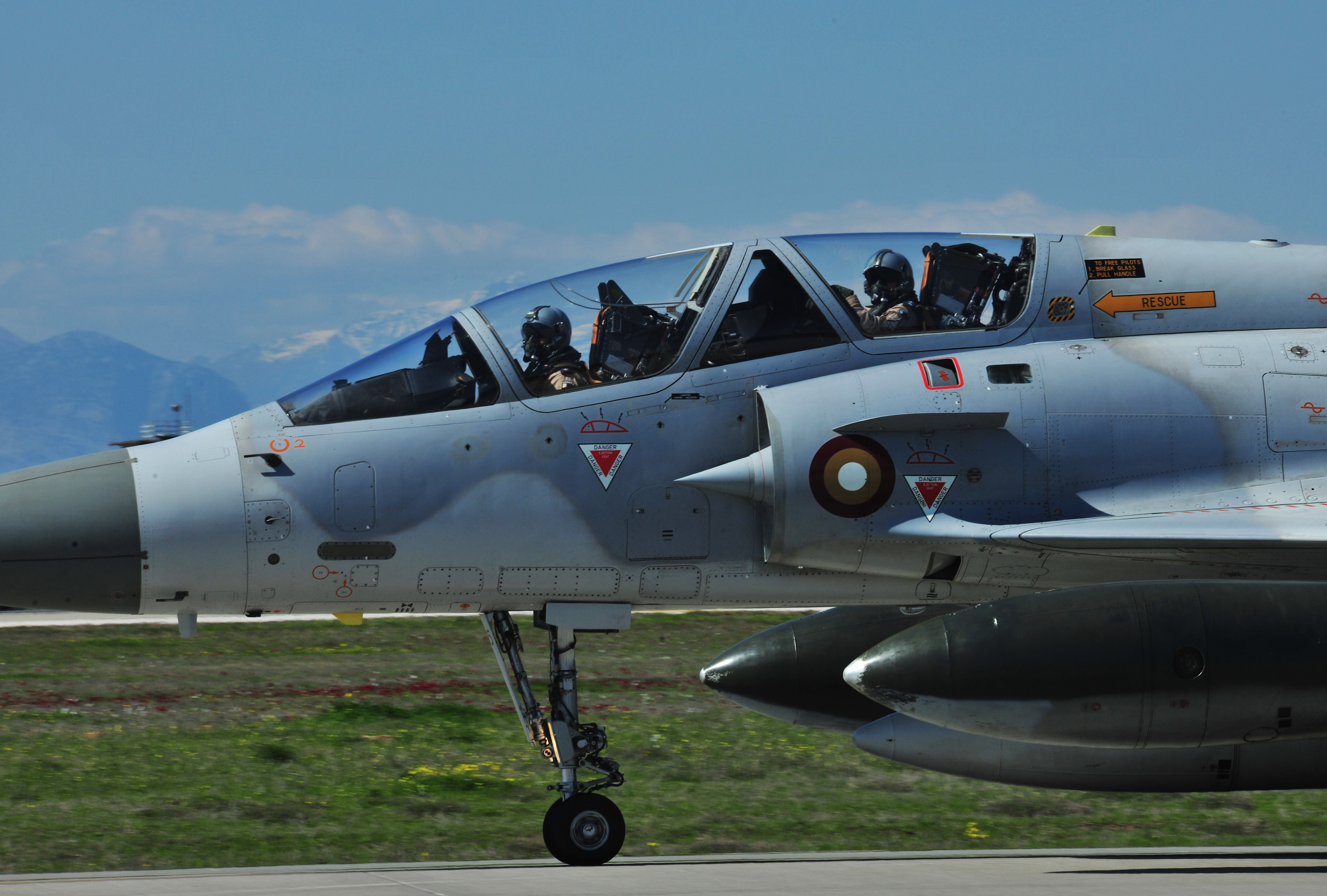
Twin-seat Qatari Mirage 2000-5

The Mirage 2000 is available as a single-seat or twin-seat multirole fighter. The pilot flies the aircraft by means of a centre stick and left-hand throttles, incorporating the HOTAS control principle. The pilot sits on a SEM MB Mk10 zero-zero ejection seat (a license-built version of the British Martin-Baker Mark 10).

=== Engines ===
The SNECMA M53 afterburning turbofan was developed for the ACF, and was available for the Mirage 2000 project. It is a single-shaft engine of modular construction that is relatively light and simple compared to those of the British or American designs. The M53 consists of three low-pressure compressor stages, five high-pressure stages, and two turbine stages. With the development programme consisting of 20 engines, the M53 sans suffix was first bench tested in February 1970, and became airborne on a Caravelle testbed in July 1973. Dassault conducted flight tests of the M53-2 version using its Mirage F1E testbeds starting in December 1974; this version produced 84 kilonewtons (19,000 lb_{f}) in afterburner. The Mirage 2000 itself was powered by two versions of the M53—the M53-5, which equipped initial operational aircraft, was rated at 88 kN (20,000 lb_{f}) of thrust with afterburner. The definitive version of the engine, the M53-P2, which equipped the majority of the type, is rated at 65 kN (15,000 lb_{f}) in dry thrust and 95 kN (21,000 lb_{f}) in afterburner. The responsiveness of the engine to thrust changes by the pilot, being considerably quicker than the preceding Snecma Atar engine, was one of the factors enabling the Mirage 2000 to achieve higher AoA than many earlier combat aircraft.

=== Payload and armaments ===
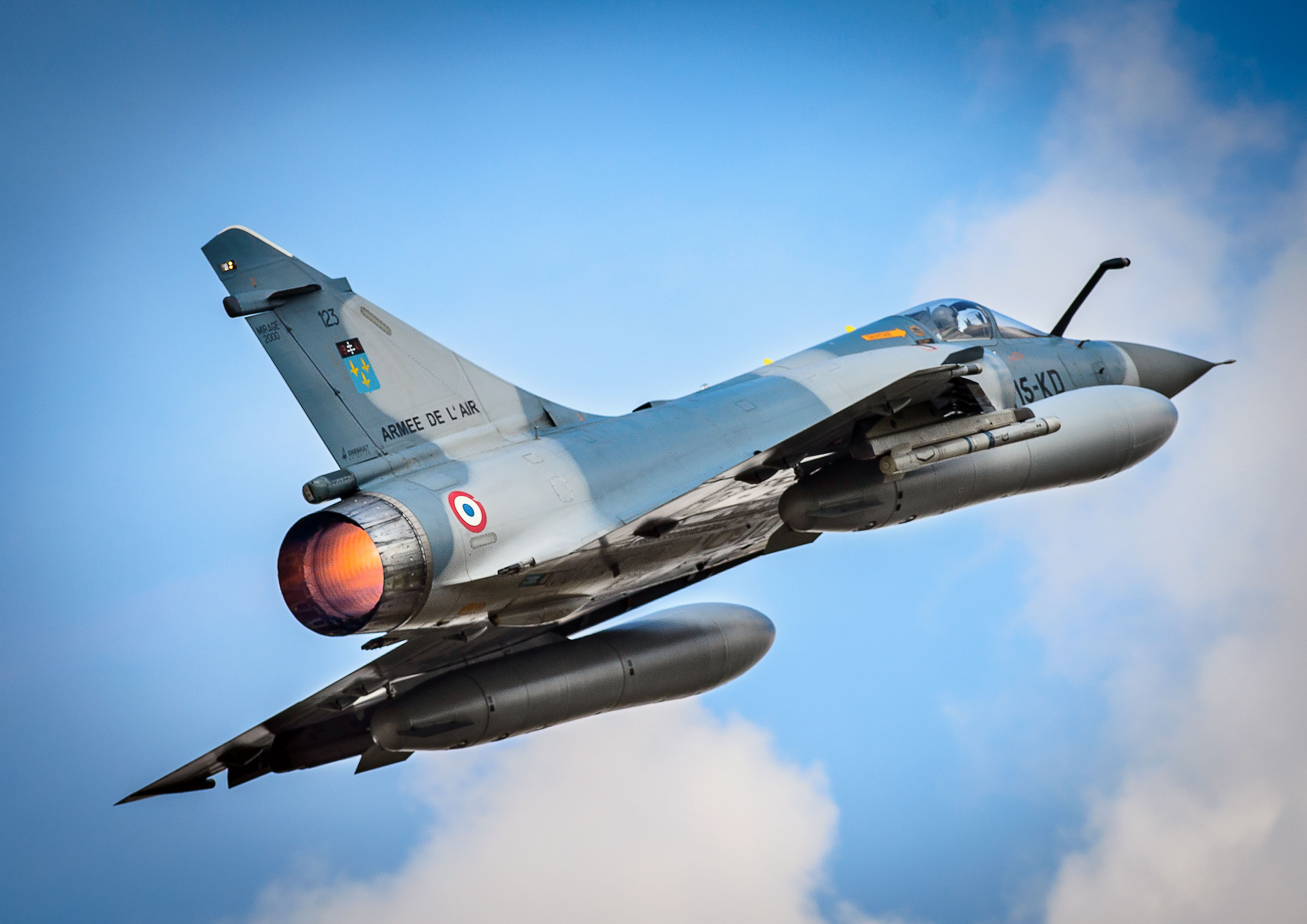
French Air Force Mirage 2000C with its armaments

The Mirage 2000 is equipped with built-in twin DEFA 554 autocannon (now GIAT 30–550 F4) 30 mm revolver-type cannons with 125 rounds each. The cannons have selectable fire rates of 1,200 or 1,800 rounds per minute.

=== Differences between variants ===
Mirage 2000-5F

The Mirage 2000-5F is a major advancement over previous variants and embodies a comprehensive electronic, sensor, and cockpit upgrade to expand its combat ability, while reducing pilot workload. The centrepiece of the Mirage 2000-5F overhaul is the Thomson-CSF RDY (radar Doppler multitarget) with look down/shoot down capability. The multifunction radar is capable of air-to-ground, air-to-air, and air-to-sea operations. In the air-to-ground mode, the RDY has mainly ground mapping and navigation functions, with no real ground attack modes. Capable of automatically locking onto multiple targets at first contact (creating a "shoot list), the radar can detect flying targets travelling as low as 60 m (200 ft). The introduction of the radar allows the aircraft to use the MICA missile, up to six of which could be fired and supported simultaneously. Despite the increase in offensive capability, pilot workload is compensated for by the introduction of a multidisplay glass cockpit, based on the development of the Rafale. The aircraft has the ICMS Mk2 countermeasures suit, which contains three radar detectors and an infrared sensor that are linked to active jammers and chaff/flare dispensers.

Improvements over the Mirage 2000C included the multimode RDY, which allows detection of up to 24 targets and the ability to simultaneously track eight threats while guiding four MICA missiles to different targets. Updates to defensive systems included the ICMS Mk2 countermeasures suite. ICMS Mk2 incorporates a receiver and associated signal processing system in the nose for detecting hostile missile-command data links, and can be interfaced to a new programmable mission-planning and postmission analysis ground system. Avionics were also updated, using a new night vision-compatible glass cockpit layout borrowed from the Dassault Rafale, a dual-linked wide-angle head-up display, and HOTAS controls. The Mirage 2000-5F can also carry the oversized drop tanks developed for the Mirage 2000N, greatly extending its range.

Mirage 2000-9 (Mirage 2000-5Mk2)

Due to the UAEs request for additional Mirage capabilities, new enhancements to offensive systems included a forward-looking infrared (FLIR) targeting pod, integration of a variety of Air To Ground munitions and a newer more stealthy Thales RDY-2 all-weather synthetic aperture radar with moving target indicator capability, which also grants the aircraft SAR mapping capabilities. The avionics were further updated with higher resolution color displays, and the addition of the modular data-processing unit designed for the Rafale. A new Thales Totem 3000 inertial navigation system with ring laser gyroscope and GPS capability were added, providing much greater accuracy, higher reliability, and shorter alignment time than the older ULISS 52 navigation system it replaced. Other upgrades included the addition of an onboard oxygen generation system for the pilot and an ICMS Mk3 digital countermeasures suite for the HAF 2000-5Mk2s.

== Operational history ==
=== France ===
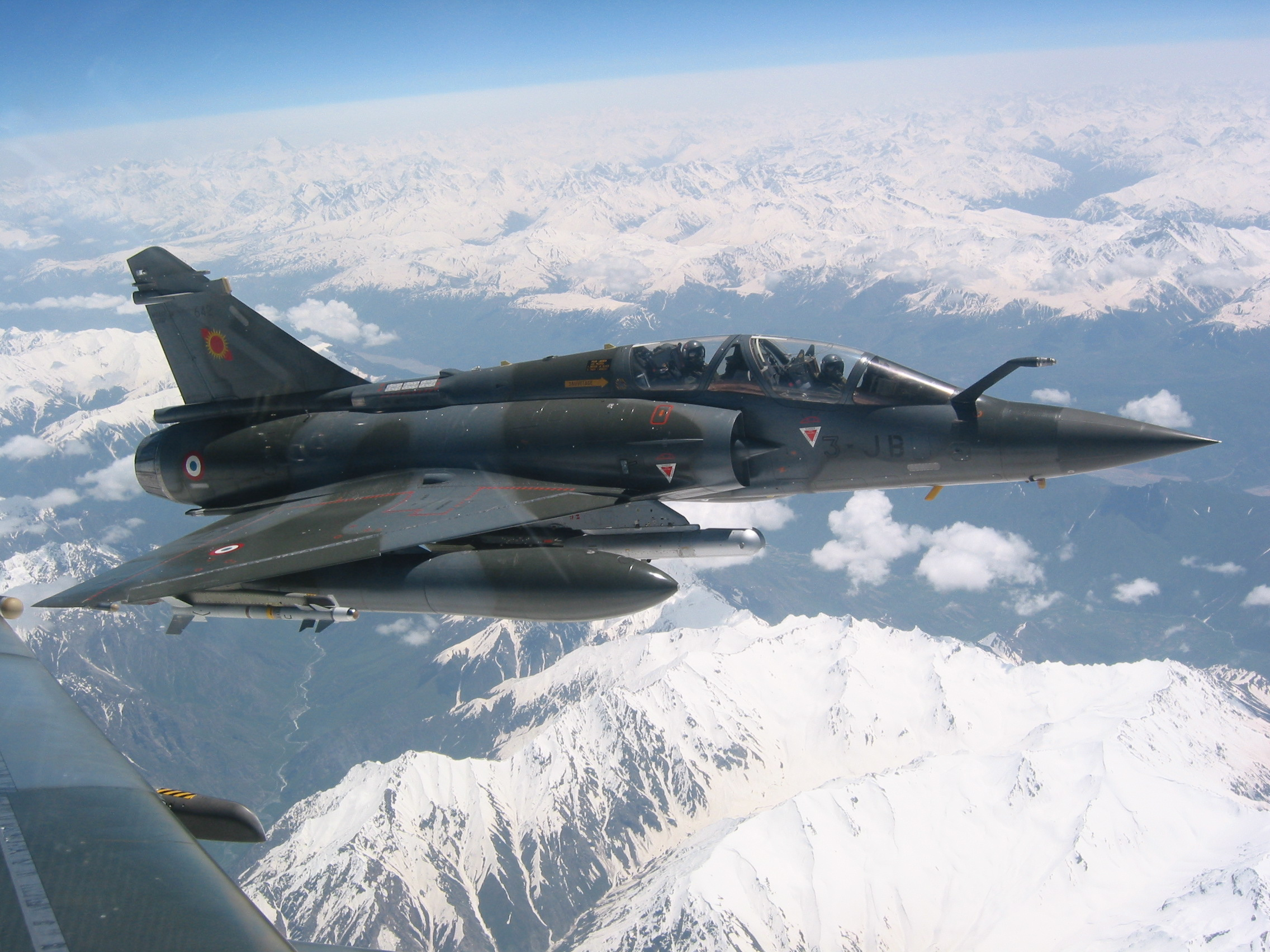
Mirage 2000D in flight, 2002

The first aircraft entered service in July 1984. The first operational squadron was formed during the same year, the 50th anniversary of the French Air Force. About 124 Mirage 2000Cs were obtained by the AdA, which were equipped by nine squadrons across three French airbases.

The Mirage 2000C made its combat debut during the Gulf War of 1991. Typical missions included combat air patrols over Saudi Arabia, as well as escorting other aircraft undertaking strike and reconnaissance missions over Kuwait and southern Iraq. In the aftermath of the conflict, Mirages 2000s continued to be periodically stationed in the region for Operation Southern Watch, the enforcement of a no-fly zone over Iraq during the 1990s.

French Mirage 2000s were deployed in support of both United Nations and NATO air operations during the Bosnian War and the Kosovo War. It was over Bosnia Herzegovina that the Mirage 2000 first used air-to-ground munitions in a live operation; it also undertook combat air patrols over the region. During Operation Deliberate Force, on 30 August 1995, one Mirage 2000D was shot down over Bosnia by a 9K38 Igla shoulder-launched missile fired by air defence units of the Army of Republika Srpska, prompting efforts to obtain improved defensive systems. Both crew members were captured and later released through mediation with the Federal Republic of Yugoslavia.

French Mirage 2000Ds later served with the International Security Assistance Force during the conflict in Afghanistan in 2001–2002, operating in close conjunction with international forces and performing precision attacks with laser-guided bombs. In the summer of 2007, after the Dassault Rafale fighters had been removed from the theater of operations, three French Mirage 2000s were deployed to Afghanistan in support of NATO troops.

On multiple occasions, Mirage 2000Cs were deployed to Lithuania as a part of France's commitment to NATO’s Baltic Air Policing mission in the region.

During 2011, in response to the Libyan civil war, French Mirage 2000s were used to enforce a no-fly zone over Libya as part of Opération Harmattan.

While less suited to ground-attack operations than most other Mirage 2000 variants, France routinely deployed its Mirage 2000Cs to Nigeria in support of Operation Barkhane, where the type performed strafing attacks against ISIS militants in the region alongside air defense sorties. In 2017, a pair of French Mirage 2000 responded to a militant attack on US and Nigerian ground forces, performing low-altitude 'intimidation' passes due to combatants being too close to use their weapons without the risk of friendly fire.

On 14 April 2018, four French Mirage 2000-5Fs participated in a joint military operation against the Syrian government with the UK and U.S. during the Syrian Civil War.

During June 2022, France retired the last of its Mirage 2000Cs as part of the service's transition to the newer Dassault Rafale; in its final years, the Mirage 2000Cs had been primarily used to train pilots for operating the newer Mirage 2000-5F and other models. The Mirage 2000 fleet is being gradually replaced in French service by the Rafale, which became operational with the French Air Force in June 2006.

On 9 March 2024, two French Mirage 2000-5Fs participated in the downing of two Houthi drones over the Red Sea in support of Operation Prosperity Guardian marking the first French aerial victories since the Second World War.

On 16 June 2026, the French Air and Space Force received its 50th (of 50) upgraded Mirage 2000D RMV fighter. In 2015, a large modernization effort began to keep them operational until 2035. The RMV programme (Rénovation Mi-Vie, tranbslated mid-life renovation) covered 50 operational aircraft and two Mirage 2000D testbed aircraft.

=== India ===
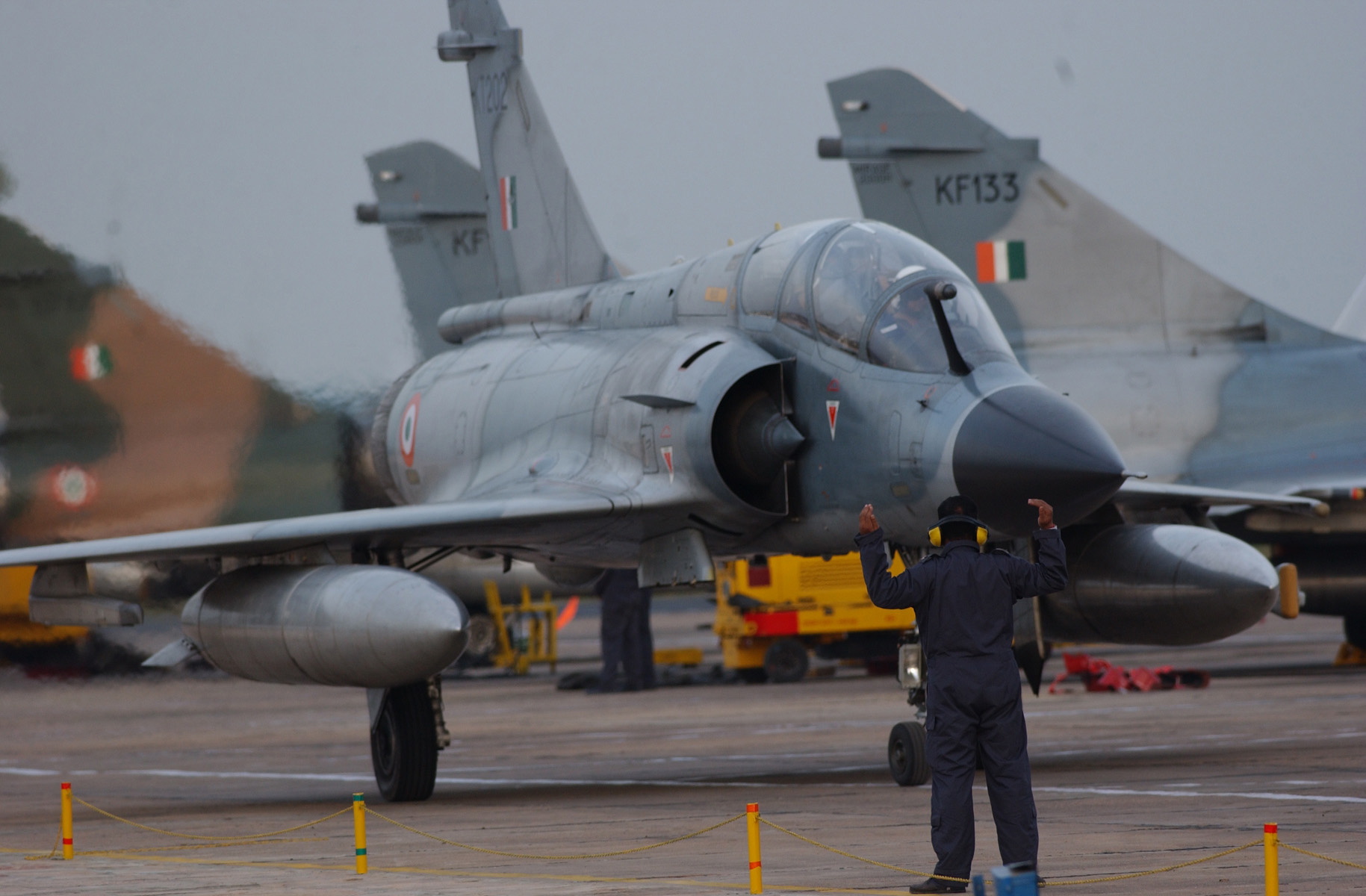
An Indian Air Force Mirage 2000TH during Cope India in 2004

The Indian government became aware of a high-performance prototype of the Mirage 2000 in the flight-testing phase while evaluating the Mirage F1 earlier. In 1980, Pakistan negotiated for the purchase of US-made F-16A/B fighters, with the agreement signed in 1981. In response, the Indian Air Force (IAF) wanted to accelerate the procurement of an advanced combat aircraft, which would be an upgrade to its existing fleet. Following trials of the Mirage 2000 by Indian test pilots in December 1980, the Indian government approached France for the purchase of 150 such aircraft in 1981. While the Soviet Union offered the MiG-25 aircraft to India, the capability of the Mirage 2000 and the willingness of France to accelerate the delivery schedule led India to favour of the French aircraft. After protracted negotiations, India signed an agreement on 13 April 1982 for the procurement of 36 single-seat Mirage 2000Hs and four twin-seat Mirage 2000THs with an option for further licensed production of 110 aircraft in India. While the agreement with France included the possibility of future manufacturing the aircraft in India, cost constraints and the Soviet offer of license production of MiG-27 in India meant that the Mirage 2000 aircraft was not produced in India.

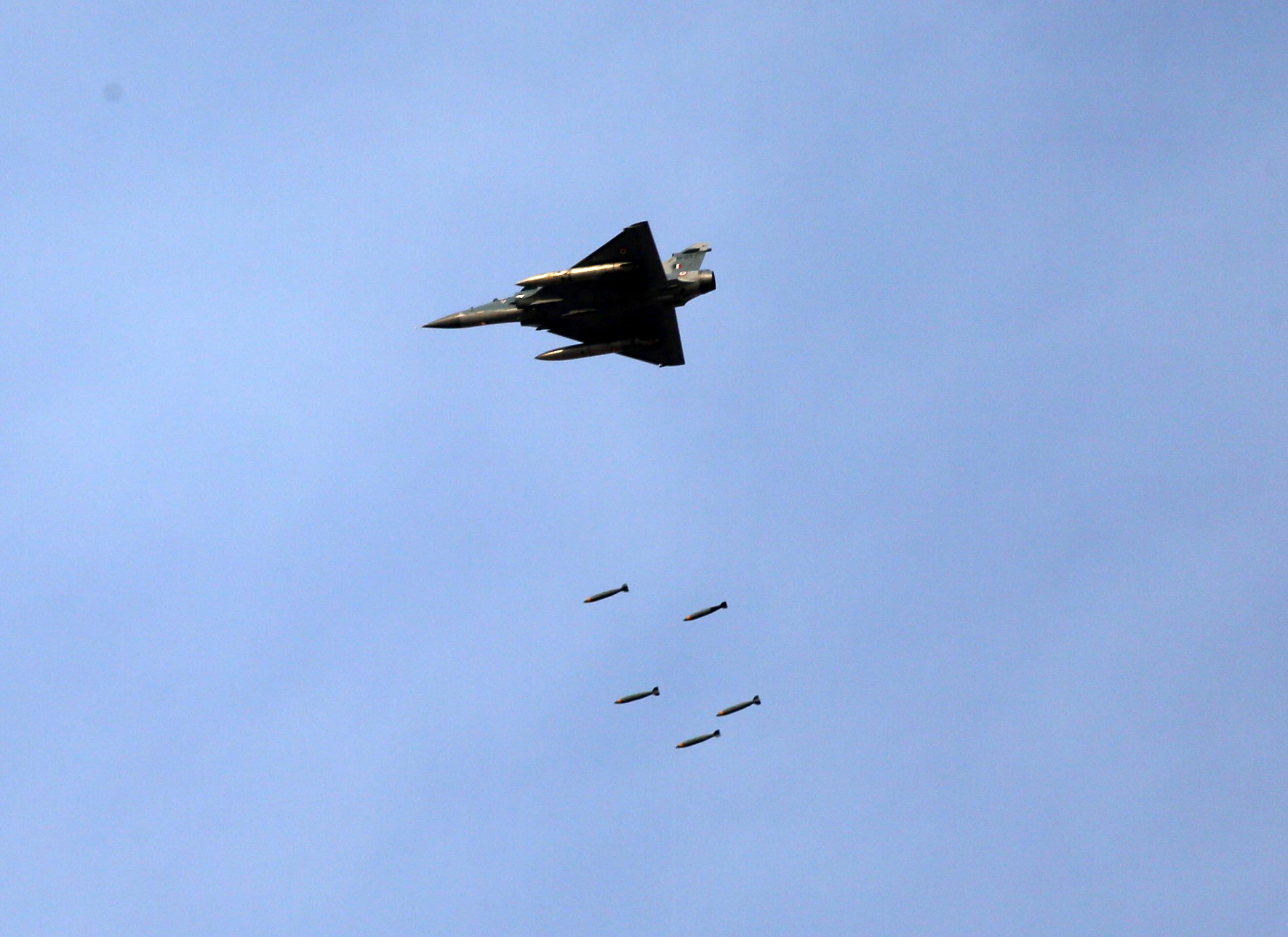
An Indian Air Force Mirage 2000 drops aerial bombs

While India had the option to procure additional Mirage 2000s, the Indian government later opted to procure the single-seater MiG-29 despite the willingness of the IAF to continue with the Mirage 2000s. The first seven Mirage 2000 aircraft were delivered to India on 29 June 1985 and the IAF became the first foreign user of the type. They were renamed as Vajra (thunderbolt in Sanskrit), and were inducted to the No. 7 Squadron of the IAF. The initial batch of the aircraft were equipped with Snecma M53-5 engines, as India did not want to wait for the introduction of the upgraded Snecma M53-P2 engines, and these were named as "Mirage 2000H5" and "Mirage 2000TH5" respectively. The later single and two-seater aircraft powered by the M53-5P2, were named as "Mirage 2000H" and "Mirage 2000TH" respectively. Subsequently, the earlier aircraft were also equipped with the upgraded engines. The No. 1 Squadron (the Tigers) was formally designated a Mirage 2000 unit in January 1986, and received the second batch of the aircraft. Within 12 months of the first delivery, the IAF had received the first batch of 40 aircraft. The Indian government signed a follow-on order for nine aircraft in 1986. The order consisting of six Mirage 2000H single-seaters and three Mirage 2000TH two-seaters were delivered from 1987 to 1988.

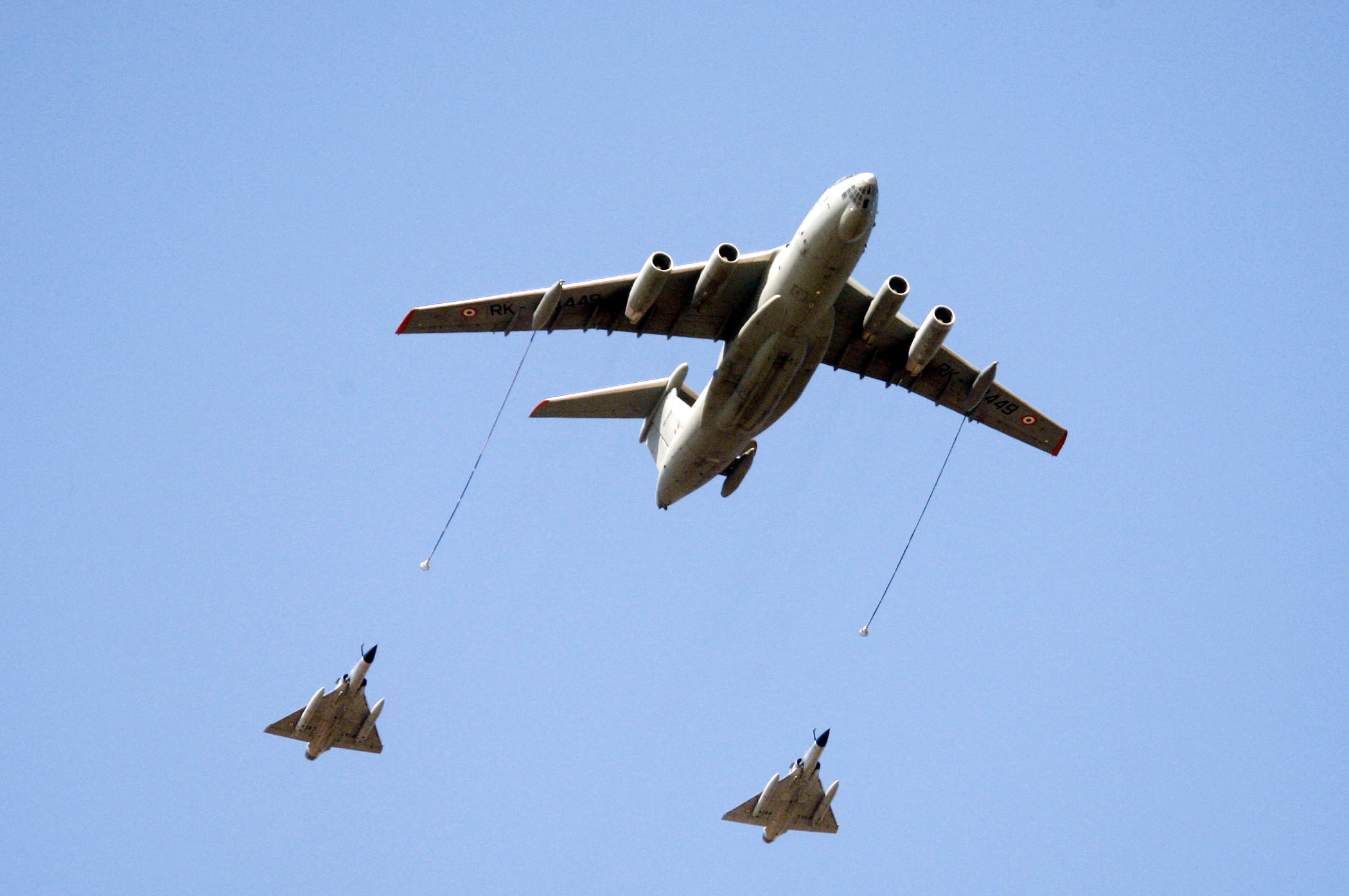
Two Mirage 2000s and an Ilyushin IL-78 of the Indian Air Force during aerial refueling

In June 1987, Indian Mirage 2000s from No.7 Squadron were tasked with providing escort for An-32s and communication support during Operation Poomalai, which involved air dropping supplies to Jaffna, which was besieged by the Sri Lankan armed forces. In November 1988, during the 1988 Maldives coup attempt, the Mirage 2000s provided escort to Indian Il-76s transporting paratroopers. The Indian Mirage fleet encountered operational difficulties in the late 1990s due to maintenance issues. In 1995, the Indian government's comptroller and auditor general flagged delays in the construction of overhaul facilities and a shortage of spare parts, which had led to the fleet being unable to meet its required flying hours. India procured ATLIS II targeting pods and 60 Bombe Guidée Laser Arcole 1,000 kg laser-guided bombs to equip the Mirage aircraft. The IAF also planned to procure cheaper US made Paveway II laser-guided bombs to augment the arsenal. However, due to an incorrect order, and the subsequent US-led embargo on India as a consequence of the Pokhran-II nuclear tests, Indian was unable to procure the necessary replacement parts, and had to manufacture them indigenously.

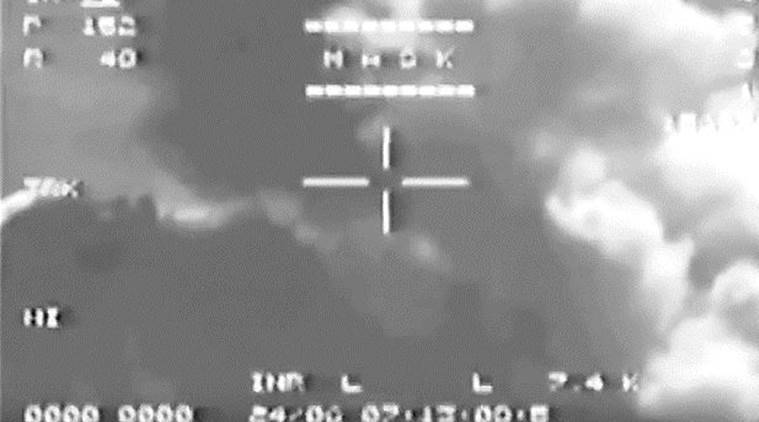
Strike footage from an IAF Mirage 2000 during the Battle of Tiger Hill in 1999

When the Kargil War broke out in May 1999, the IAF was tasked with supporting the ground troops on 25 May. The Mirage aircraft were modified in a short time frame to drop laser-guided bombs as well as conventional unguided bombs. The aircraft were equipped with Israeli AN/AAQ-28 Litening pods before the installation of laser guided bombs by mid-June in 1999. Under the code name of Operation Safed Sagar ("White sea" in Sanskrit), the Mirage 2000 flew its first sortie on 30 May. From May to July 1999, the two Mirage squadrons flew 514 sorties with only three drop outs. The No. 1 Squadron flew 274 air defence and strike escort missions, and the No. 7 Squadron conducted 240 strike missions during which it dropped 55,000 kg (121,000 lb) of ordnance. The aircraft used the Paveway bombs on eight occasions, mainly for the destruction of enemy command bunkers. The Mirages were flown under tight constraints so as to not cross the Line of Control, and the air raids by the Mirage fleet aided the Indian Army in the battles of Point 4875, Tiger Hill, and Tololing point. Overall, the aircraft reportedly performed well throughout the entire conflict in the high altitudes of the Himalayas, and a key element in India's establishment of air superiority during the two-month conflict. During the subsequent India–Pakistan standoff in 2001-02, the Mirage 2000s were used to target Pakistani bunkers using precision-guided bombs.

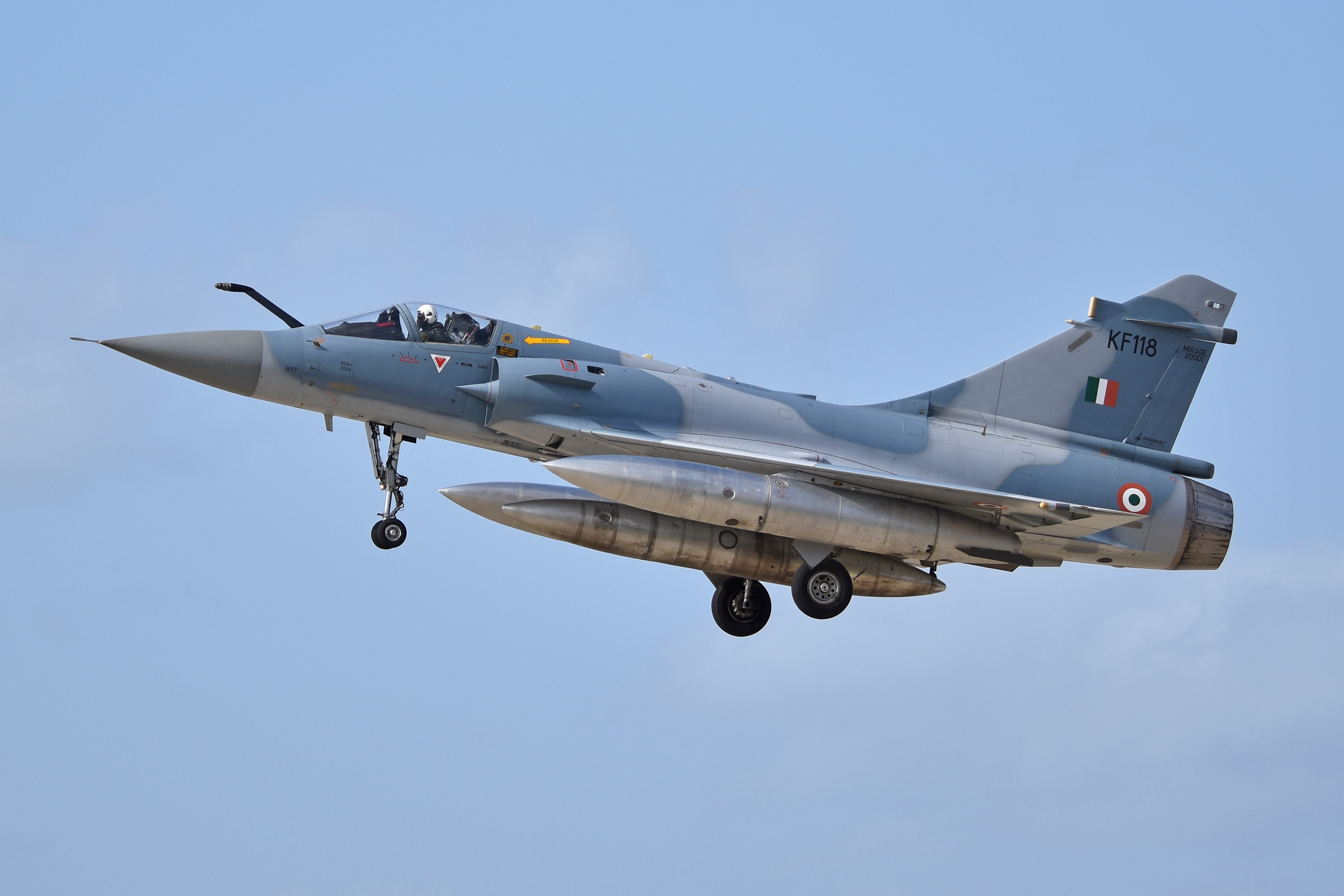
An upgraded Indian Air Force Mirage 2000I in 2023

In 2004, the Indian government approved the purchase of 10 additional Mirage 2000Hs, featuring improved avionics including an upgraded RDM 7 radar. The Mirage 2000 fleet was also equipped with the R-73 around 2005. Considering the performance of the Mirage 2000s, the Mirage 2000-5 became a contender for the Indian MRCA competition for the order of 126 multi-role combat aircraft. However, Dassault later replaced the Mirage 2000 with the newer Rafale for the competition due to the impending closure of the Mirage 2000 production line.

In July 2011, India approved a €1.6 billion (US$2.2 B) upgrade package for its existing fleet of 51 Mirage 2000s, to extend its lifetime for another 20 to 25 years The fleet was to be upgraded to the Mirage 2000-5 Mk variant, with provisions for a night vision-capable glass cockpit, upgraded navigation and Identification Friend or Foe systems, an advanced multimode multilayered radar, and an integrated electronic warfare suite, among other updates. Two of the aircraft was to be upgraded in France, while the remaining 49 was planned to be upgraded by Hindustan Aeronautics Limited in India with technical assistance from Dassault. Additionally, India placed an order for MICA missiles to be used with the upgraded fleet. The first two upgraded aircraft were returned to the IAF in March 2015, with the single seat version designated as Mirage 2000I and the twin-seat version as Mirage 2000TI. The Mirage 2000 fleet was also integrated with the MICA missile in 2016.

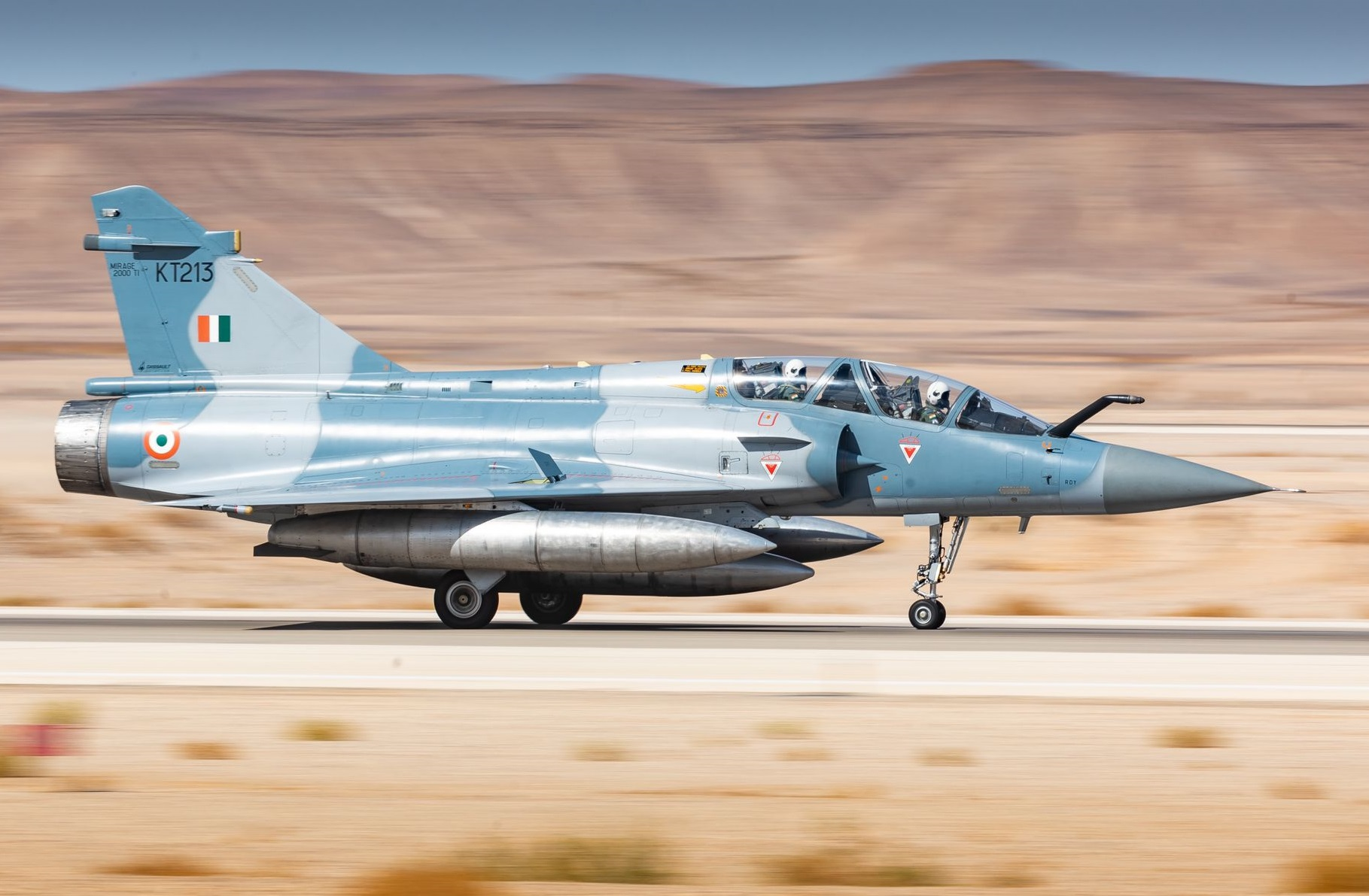
An Indian Air Force Mirage 2000 at the Blue Flag exercise in 2021

On 26 February 2019, 12 Mirage 2000s were used by the IAF to conduct an airstrike on an alleged militant training camp in Balakot in Pakistan. This was the first time since the Indo-Pakistani War of 1971 that the Indian fighters aircraft entered Pakistani airspace. The aircraft were armed with Israeli made Spice 2000 bombs. The next day, various IAF aircraft including the Mirage 2000Is were involved in dogfights against the Pakistan Air Force (PAF) aircraft, when they aimed to target Indian Army ammunition dumps and other infrastructure in the Indian administered Kashmir. During the 2020 standoff between India and China, the IAF deployed Mirage 2000Is along the Line of Actual Control. While the Mirage upgrade program were initially scheduled for completion before 2021, it stretched out to the mid-2020s. In September 2021, India obtained 24 phased-out Mirage 2000s from France, primarily for spares. Bought at a cost of €1 million per plane, 13 aircraft were to be delivered in flyaway condition with intact engines and airframes while the remaining 11 jets were planned to be scavenged for parts.

In May 2025, Mirage 2000s were used by the IAF in the conflict with Pakistan to target PAF airbases using precision-guided munitions. The Washington Post reported that one Mirage 2000 may have been hit during the clash and crashed, and French Air Force chief Jerome Bellanger told Associated Press that he had seen evidence that three Indian aircraft including, a Mirage 2000, were downed in the conflict. While India acknowledged aircraft losses, it did not confirm the details, and France claimed that misinformation has been spread deliberately to undermine the sales of the French aircraft, without providing further details.

=== Peru ===
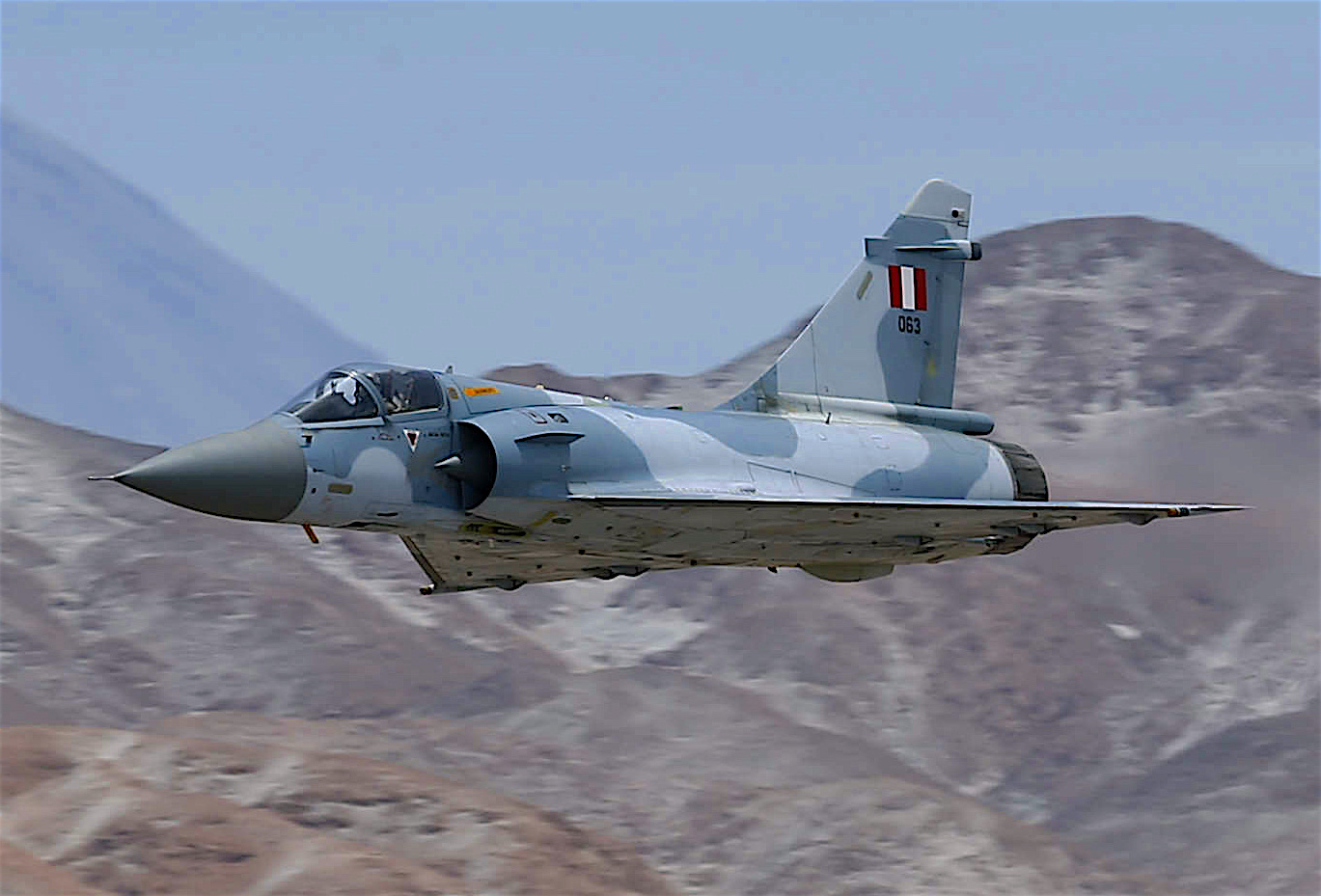
A Peruvian Air Force Mirage 2000

In December 1982, Peru placed an $800 million order for 14 single-seat Mirage 2000Ps and two two-seat Mirage 2000DP trainers, with an option for eight and two more aircraft, respectively. Although the contract was signed in 1985, the Peruvian government, due to the country's financial issues, renegotiated the number of aircraft to be reduced to 10 single-seaters and two two-seaters. Handover of the first aircraft occurred in June 1985, although the first deliveries to Peru were not made until December 1986, after the initial training of pilots in France had been completed. Peru's Mirage 2000s underwent an inspection and partial electronic modernisation programme following a $140 million deal in 2009 that involved Dassault, Snecma, and Thales. The aircraft were expected to be retired by 2025 but nine Mirage 2000Ps and two Mirage 2000DP trainers are still reported to be in service in 2026 until replacement aircraft are procured.

==== Cenepa War ====
The Peruvian Air Force ordered a set of munitions similar to that ordered by Egypt, along with ATLIS II targeting pods. The Peruvian Mirages flew combat air patrol missions in 1995 during the Cenepa War.

=== United Arab Emirates ===
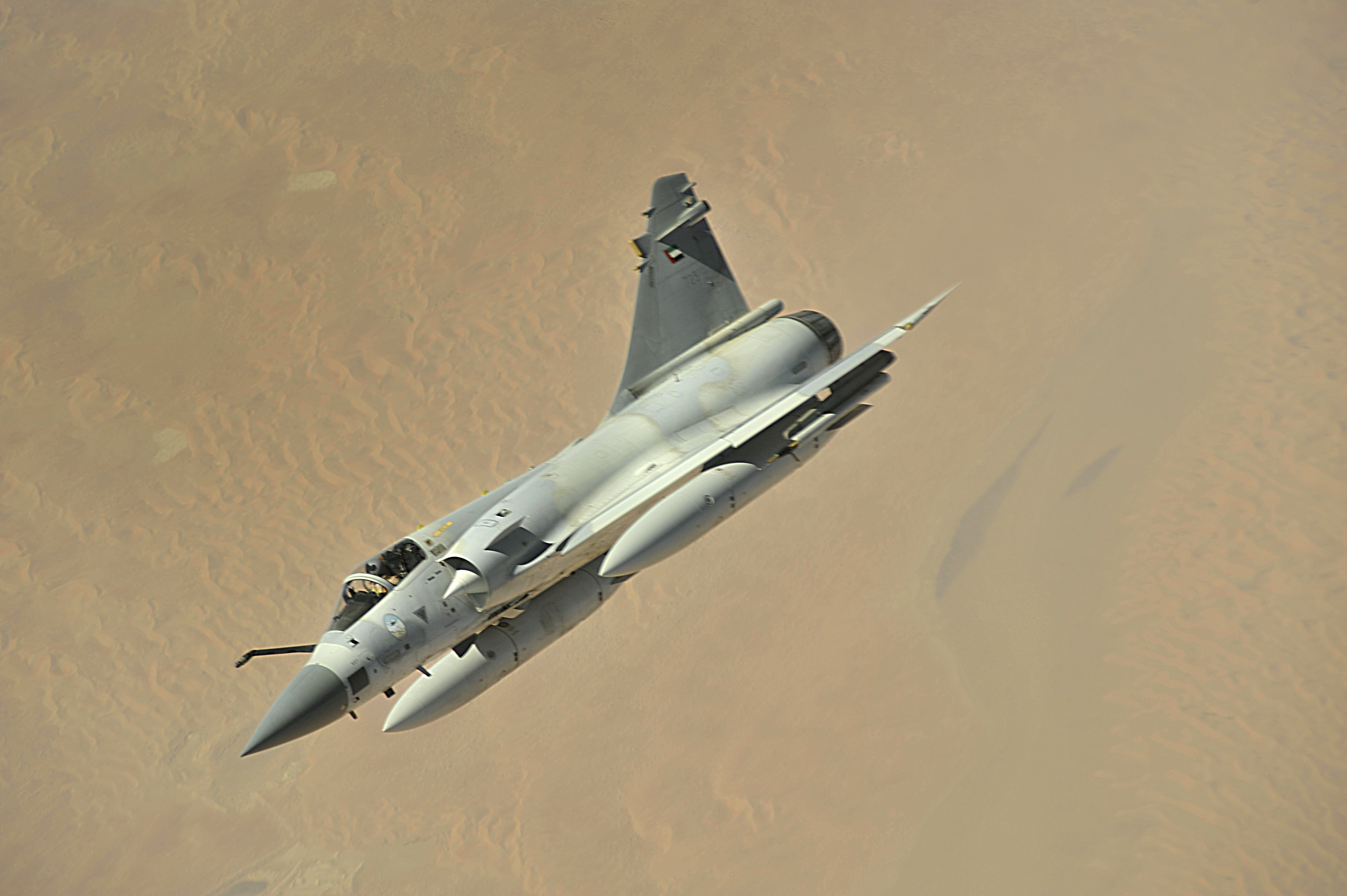
UAE Mirage 2000RAD during Operation Desert Storm

In May 1983, the United Arab Emirates (UAE) placed an order for 36 Mirage 2000 aircraft. The order consisted of 22 single-seat Mirage 2000AED, eight unique single-seat reconnaissance variants designated Mirage 2000RAD, and six Mirage 2000DAD trainers, which collectively are known as SAD-8 (Standard Abu Dhabi). The order specified an Italian-made defensive avionics suite that delayed delivery of the first of these aircraft until 1989.

In November 1998, the UAE signed a $3.2 billion contract that consisted of an order for 30 Mirage 2000-9s, as well as the deal to upgrade 33 of the surviving SAD-8 aircraft up the new standard. The contract was later amended so it would encompass 32 new-built aircraft—20 single-seater Mirage 2000-9s and 12 two-seater 2000-9Ds—and 30 upgrade kits for original aircraft. The aircraft were equipped with a classified countermeasures system designated IMEWS. Although deliveries were scheduled for 2001, the first aircraft arrived in the spring of 2003.

The UAE's Mirage 2000-9s are equipped for the strike mission, with the Shehab laser targeting pod (a variant of the Damocles) and the Nahar navigation pod, complementing the air-to-ground modes of the RDY-2 radar. They are also equipped with a classified countermeasures system designated IMEWS, which is comparable to the ICMS 3. Emirati Mirage 2000s are armed with weapons such as the PGM 500 guided bomb and the "Black Shaheen" cruise missile, which is basically a variant of the MBDA Apache cruise missile. All 30 survivors of this first batch have been extensively refurbished and upgraded, bringing them to the same standard as the Mirage 2000-9.

==== Gulf War ====
UAE Mirage 2000s flew in the Gulf War of 1991, but had little action. Six Mirage 2000s were to participate in the enforcement of the no-fly zone over Libya.

==== Intervention in Yemen ====
As part of the Saudi Arabian-led intervention in Yemen on 14 March 2016, a UAE Mirage 2000-9D crashed in the southern Yemeni city of Aden during a combat operation in the early morning hours, killing its two pilots. The Arab coalition claims the Mirage crashed due to a technical fault. Other sources reported that the Mirage 2000-9D was shot down by Yemeni Al-Qaeda militants using a Strela-2 MANPADS while flying low.

==== In Libya ====
On 2 July 2019, during the 2019–20 Western Libya campaign, an airstrike hit the Tajoura Detention Center outside Tripoli, Libya, which was being used as a holding facility for migrants and refugees trying to reach Europe, was struck from the air. A storage hangar being used as a residential facility was destroyed by the attack, killing at least 53 people and wounding 130. The Libyan Government of National Accord (GNA) initially claimed that the airstrike was conducted by the Libyan National Army (LNA), but later attributed the attack to a UAE aircraft. A January 2020 report by the United Nations Support Mission in Libya (UNSMIL) and the Office of the United Nations High Commissioner for Human Rights (OHCHR) stated that the strike was likely to have been carried out with a guided bomb fired from a non-Libyan aircraft, again suggesting that a foreign Mirage 2000 had been used.

=== Greece ===
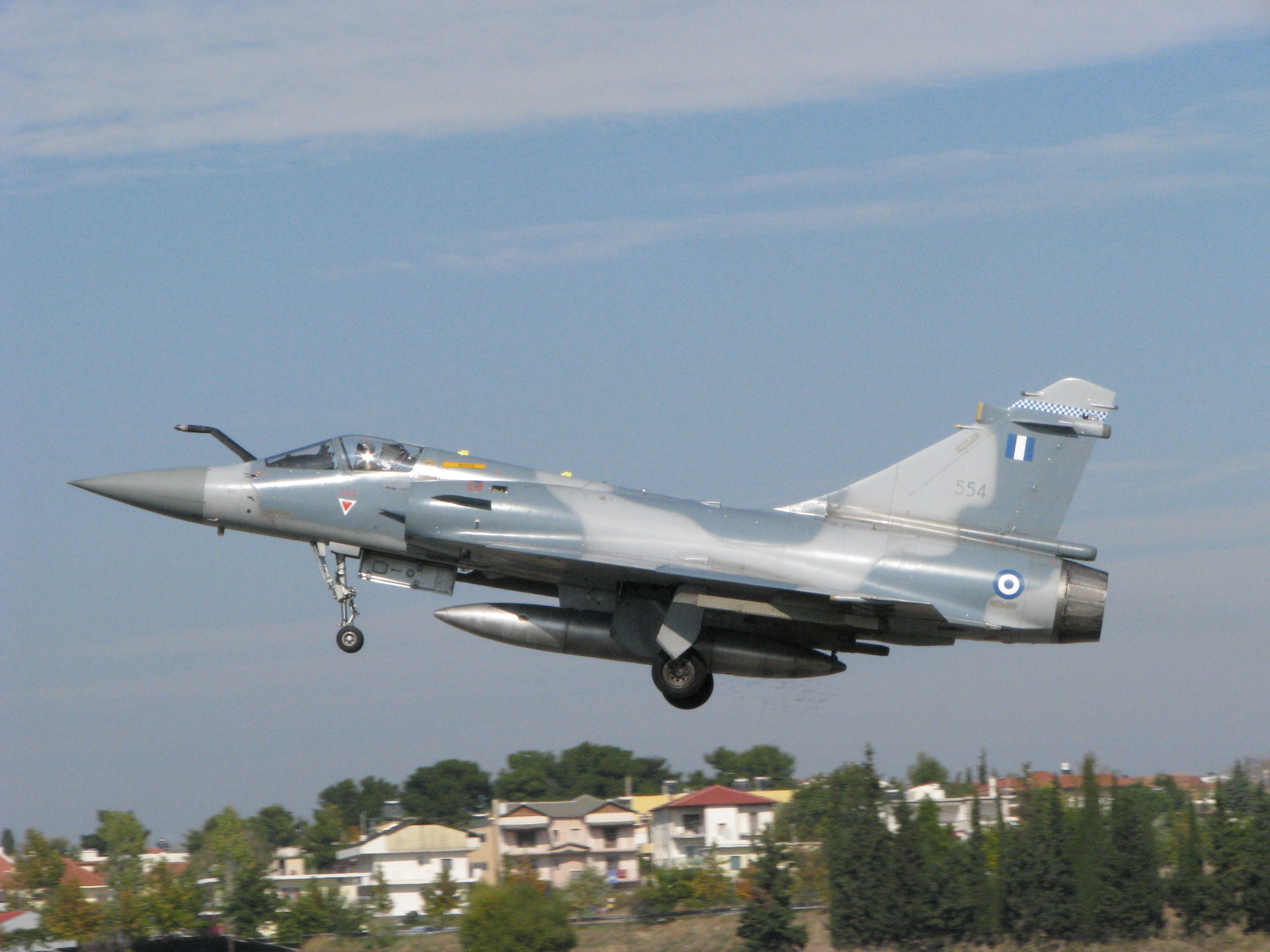
Hellenic Air Force Mirage 2000-5

In July 1985, Greece signed a contract for 40 Mirage 2000s: 36 single-seat aircraft and 4 two-seat trainers. The order came as part of a larger defence acquisition programme that saw the country, for political reasons, proceed with an order for the F-16. The $1.38B Mirage contract also consisted of weapons and equipment, as well as industrial offsets that permitted HAI to produce the M53-P2 engines. The first aircraft were delivered in June 1988 and the last, by the end of 1989. They featured an "ICMS Mk. 1" defensive countermeasures suite (DCS), an updated version of the standard Mirage 2000C DCS, characterised by two small antennas near the top of the tailfin. Initially armed with R.550 Matra Magic-2 missiles. During the "Talos" modernisation project of the 1990s, carried out by Hellenic Aerospace Industry and supervised by Dassault and Thompson-CSF, the aircraft received: a vastly improved RDM-3 radar set; the ICMS 1 DCS; the ability to carry the Super-530D medium-range missile and the AM39 Exocet Block II anti-ship missile. After "Talos", the aircraft were renamed Mirage-2000EGM/BGM.

In August 2000, Greece placed a $1.1B order for a batch of 15 new Mirage 2000-5 Mk. 2 fighters, and had 10 existing Mirage 2000EGMs upgraded to Mirage 2000-5 Mk. 2 standard. The upgrade meant the addition of the RDY-2 radar and ICMS-3 DCS, and the ability to deploy SCALP cruise missiles and both versions of the MICA instead, an order for which was placed. Deliveries of the upgraded aircraft took place between 2004 and 2005. In December 2019, Greece signed contracts for a €260M further upgrade of its remaining Mirage 2000s, focused on their electronics and engines. All Greek machines (Mk 2s and EGMs) feature the TOTEM-3000 INS of the Mk2 instead of the Uliss-52 and have hose-and-drogue aerial refueling capability.

During 2022, Greece's remaining fleet of Mirage 2000s was withdrawn and placed into storage shortly after the delivery of new Dassault Rafale fighters, various options have been reportedly explored for a potential sale.

==== Greco-Turkish Aegean standoff ====
On 8 October 1996, seven months after the escalation of the dispute with Turkey over the Imia/Kardak islands, a Turkish F-16D crashed into the Aegean Sea after interception by Greek Mirages. The Turkish pilot died, while the co-pilot ejected and was rescued by Greek forces. In August 2012, after the downing of a RF-4E on the Syrian coast, Turkish Defence Minister İsmet Yılmaz claimed that the Turkish F-16D was shot down in 1996 by a Greek Mirage 2000 with an R.550 Magic II near Chios island. Greece denies that the F-16 was shot down. Both Mirage 2000 pilots reported that the F-16 caught fire and that they saw one parachute.

On 12 April 2018, a Greek Mirage 2000-5, part of a two-ship formation, crashed into the Aegean Sea north of the Skyros air base after being scrambled to intercept two Turkish F-16s that were in the disputed airspace. When the Mirage pair arrived in the area, the Turkish jets had already left. The Greek pilot died in the crash, which was attributed to Saharan dust in the air; both Mirage pilots were flying low in poor visibility.

=== Taiwan ===
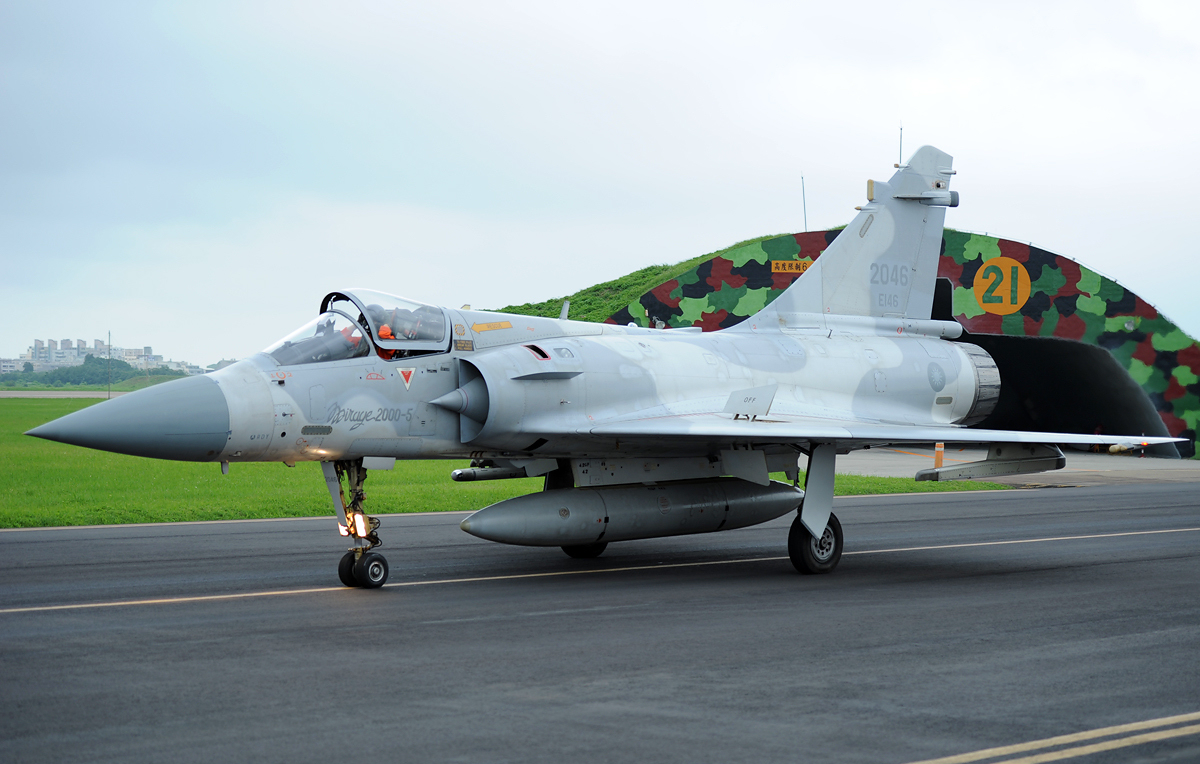
A ROCAF Mirage 2000-5EI

In response to mainland China's purchase of the Su-27, the Republic of China (Taiwan) began talks with the US and France about the possible purchase of new fighters. While the US opposed Taiwan's acquisition of the Mirage 2000 and instead pressured it to procure the F-16, the Republic of China Air Force became the first customer for the Mirage 2000-5 in November 1992. The order for 48 single-seat Mirage 2000-5EIs and 12 Mirage 2000-5DI trainers was condemned by China. The order also included 480 Magic short-range air-to-air missiles, 960 MICA intermediate-range air-to-air missiles, auxiliary fuel tanks, ground support equipment, and monitoring equipment; total costs amounted to US$4.9 billion, of which $2.6B was for the aircraft. The MICA missile provides the Mirage with a degree of beyond-visual-range (BVR) capability needed for its role as frontline interceptor. In addition, a set of ASTAC electronic intelligence (ELINT) pods was ordered. A number of centerline twin gun pods with DEFA 554 cannons were also acquired and fitted on the two-seaters, as they do not have an internal gun armament.

Taiwanese Mirage 2000s were delivered from May 1997 to November 1998, and are based at Hsinchu AB. The RoCAF's Mirages have suffered from low operational readiness and high maintenance costs; the harsh environment and high operational tempo have caused higher than expected wear and tear. After cracks were detected in the blades of the aircraft's engines in 2009, Dassault worked with Taiwanese authorities to successfully rectify the issue and provided compensation for the engine damage. By the following year, normal training hours of 15 per month had resumed and the fleet's operational readiness had been restored, after having reportedly dropped to 6 hours per month because of the engine troubles. There were also considerations of mothballing the entire Mirage fleet because of its high maintenance costs. Although the aircraft's maintenance costs more than that of the AIDC F-CK-1 Ching-kuo and the Lockheed F-16 Fighting Falcon, the fleet was reportedly still being flown. Yet plans to upgrade the fleet have not been executed, since the upgrade is cost prohibitive.

=== Qatar ===
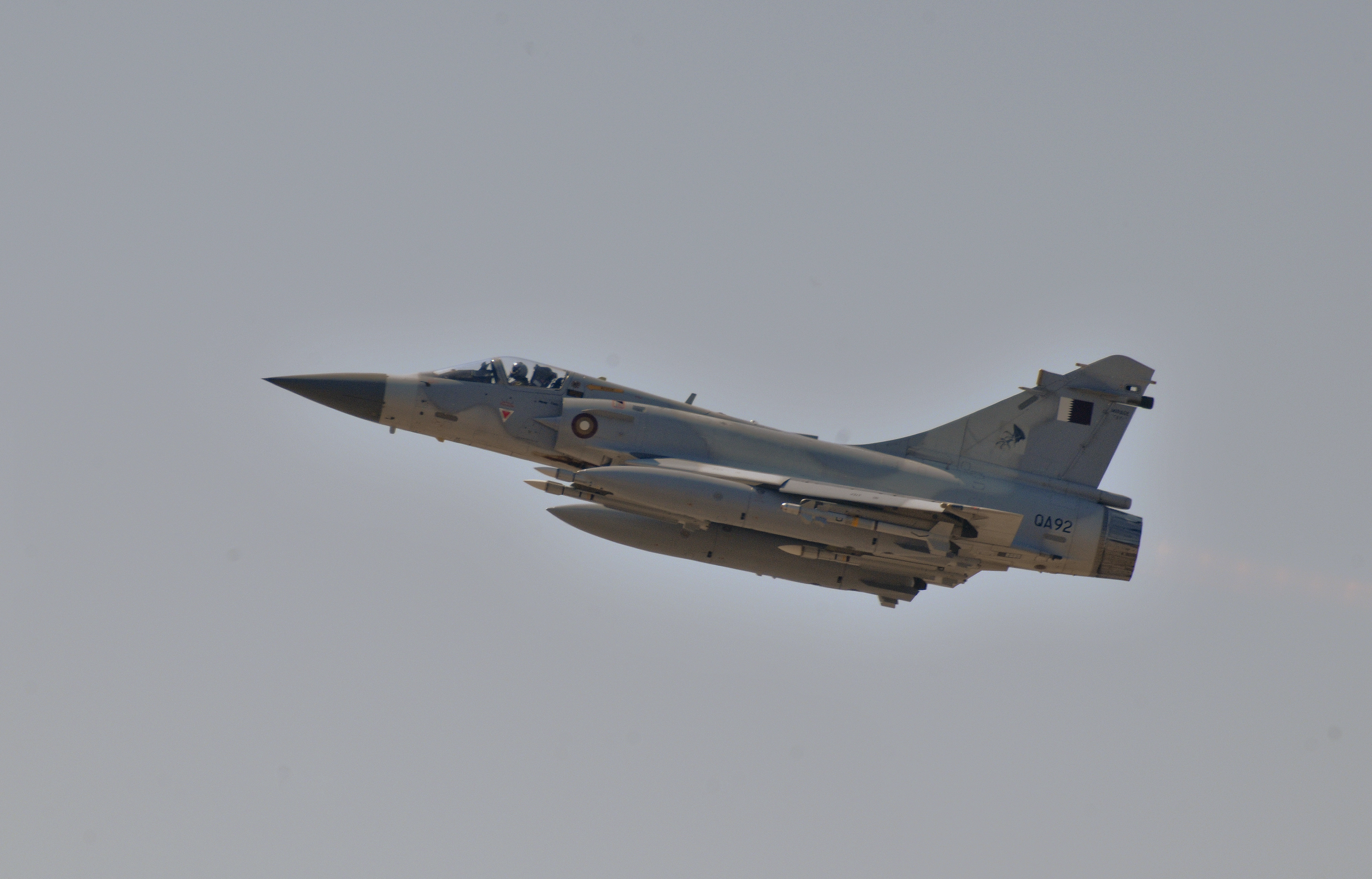
A Qatar Emiri Air Force Mirage 2000-5 participating in Odyssey Dawn

In 1994, Qatar became the second export customer for the Mirage 2000-5 as it ordered twelve aircraft to replace its Mirage F1EDAs. Designated Mirage 2000-5DAs, the aircraft ordered consisted of nine single-seaters (5EDA) and three two-seaters (5DDA), and the first delivery was made in September 1997. Qatar also purchased the MICA missile and the Apache stand-off cruise missile. The aircraft would be used sparingly, and by the mid-2000s, under pressure from the US to dispose of the aircraft and with most of the aircraft's operational life still intact, Qatar offered to sell the aircraft to Pakistan and later India. However, no such deal has materialised as of 2016.

In March 2011, Mirage 2000s were deployed to an airbase on the Greek island of Crete as part of Qatar's commitment to assist in the NATO-enforced no-fly zone over Libya. The aircraft would soon jointly enforce the no-fly zone along with French Mirage 2000-5 aircraft.

=== Brazil ===
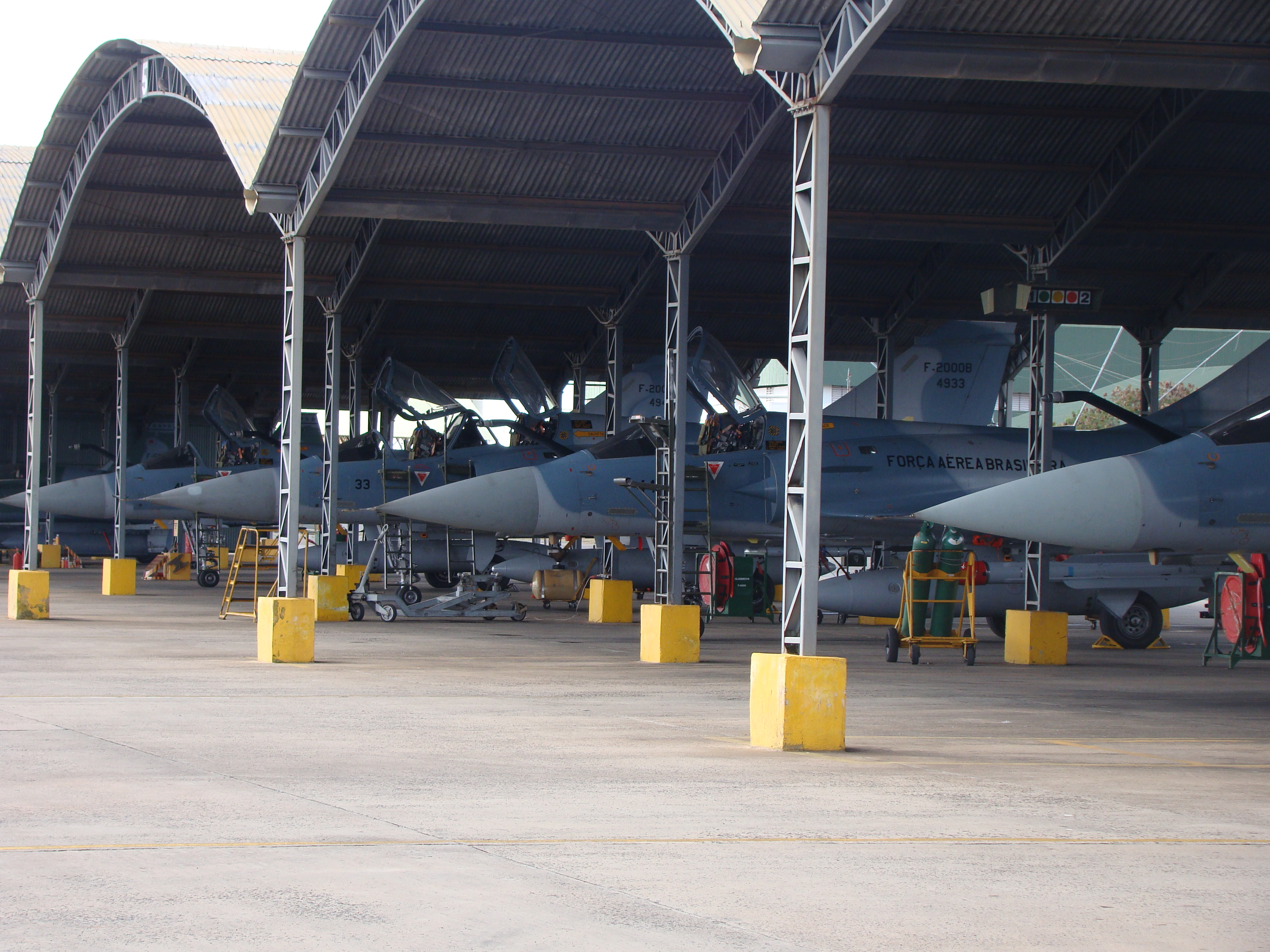
A Brazilian Air Force Mirage 2000

Dassault participated in a competition to replace the Brazilian Air Force's aging Mirage IIIEBR/DBRs with a Brazilian-specific version of the Mirage 2000-9 that would have been developed in collaboration with Embraer designated Mirage 2000BR. However, due to Brazilian fiscal problems, the competition dragged on for years until it was suspended in February 2005. Instead, Brazil in July 2005 purchased 12 ex-French Air Force Mirage 2000 aircraft (ten "C" and two "B" versions), designated F-2000, for $72 million. Deliveries began in September 2006 and concluded on 27 August 2008 with the delivery of the last 2 aircraft. According to Journal of Electronic Defense, the figure was $200 million, which consisted of a significant number of Magic 2 air-to-air missiles, and the AdA would provide full conversion training in France and full logistical support. The ten single-seat fighters and two twin-seat combat-trainers were drawn from operational squadrons Escadron de Chasse 1/5 and 2/5, based at Orange AB, respectively. The first delivery was made September 2006 to 1º Grupo de Defesa Aérea (1º GDA – 1st Air Defence Group) based at Annapolis. They were primarily used in the air-defence role and were equipped with Matra Super 530D and Matra Magic 2. Brazil officially retired its fleet in December 2013, just before the maintenance contract with Dassault concluded.

=== Ukraine ===
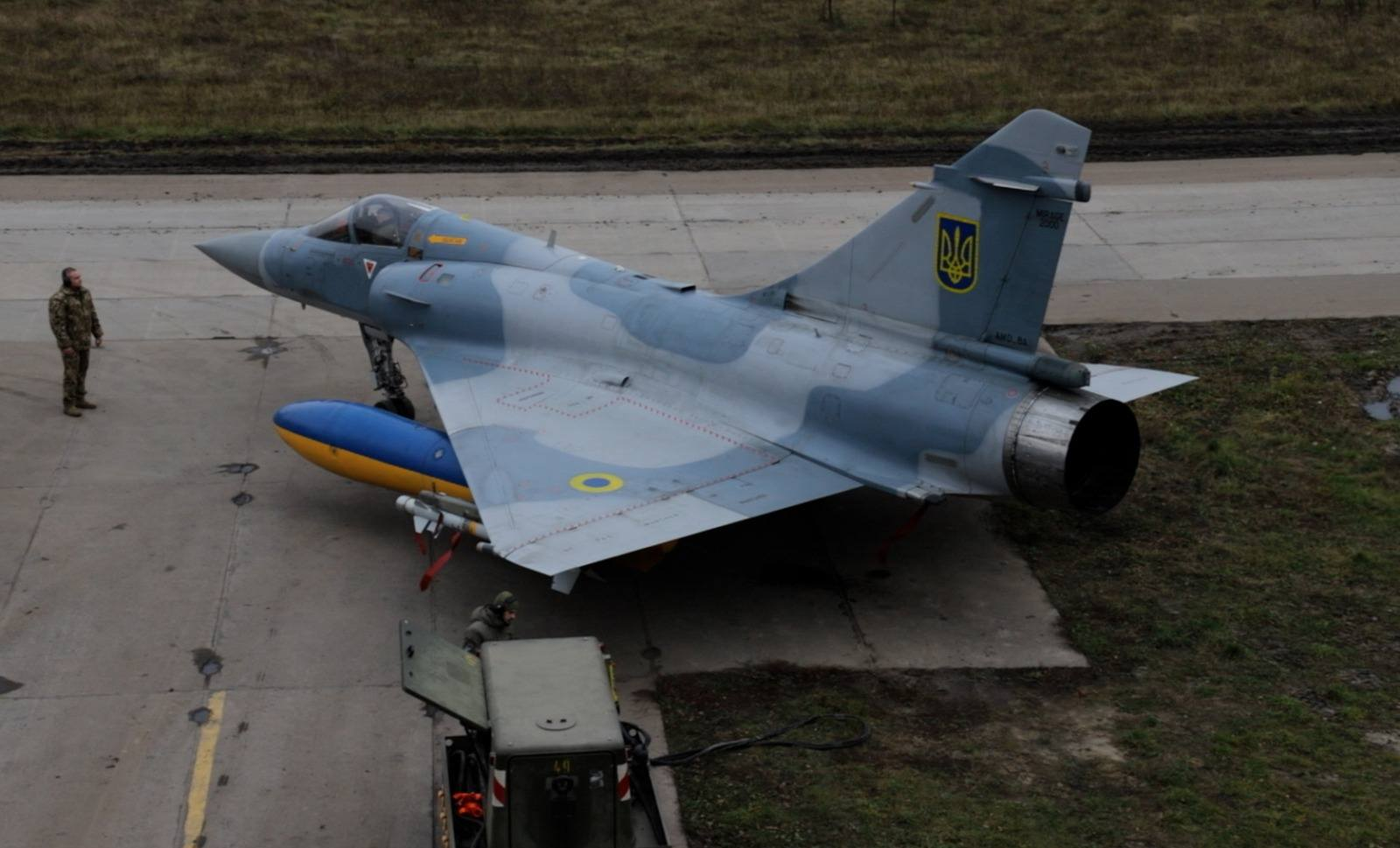
A Ukrainian Mirage 2000-5F

Following the Russian invasion of Ukraine in 2022, Ukraine had expressed interest in the Mirage 2000, and it was reported in March 2023 that France has been training Ukrainian pilots on this aircraft in anticipation that some may be sent to Ukraine. French President Emmanuel Macron announced during a televised interview on 6 June 2024 that an unspecified number of Mirage 2000-5s are to be delivered to Ukraine. The French defense minister announced on 6 February 2025 that the first Mirage 2000 had been delivered to Ukraine. Ukrainian Mirage 2000s are equipped with both the Matra Magic and MICA air-air missiles.

==== Russo-Ukraine War ====
On 7 March 2025, Mirages were deployed alongside F-16s to intercept Russian cruise missiles and drones launched overnight. According to the Ukrainian Air Force, 34 missiles and 100 drones were intercepted by fighter jets, surface-to-air missile systems, jammers, and mobile fire groups. The Mirage 2000 managed to score a major victory as it was its first air-to-air victory, defeating a Kh-101 cruise missile.

On the evening of 22 July 2025, a Ukrainian Air Force Mirage 2000 crashed during a combat mission over Volyn Oblast, Ukraine, after the pilot reported a technical malfunction. The pilot ejected safely, and the aircraft impacted rural moorland, sinking into the muddy ground and forming a waterlogged crater. A combat search and rescue (CSAR) team recovered the pilot, whose condition was assessed as stable. No injuries or fatalities were reported as a result of the accident. The Ukrainian State Bureau of Investigation secured the crash site and initiated an investigation into the cause of the accident.

On 2 October 2026, an Ukrainian Mirage 2000-5F shot down a Russian S8000 Banderol cruise missile with its onboard 30 mm DEFA 554, in a first kill of its kind.

=== Failed bids ===
==== Indonesia ====
By the mid-1980s, Indonesia was considering the Mirage 2000, F-16 Fighting Falcon, and Panavia Tornado for its new fighter program. In June 1984, four Indonesian Air Force pilots and several ground crew were sent to southern France to examine and test flew the Mirage 2000B prototype. The F-16 won the program in 1986.

In 2022, Indonesia was considering the acquisition of used Mirage 2000s for the Indonesian Air Force. 12 Mirage 2000-5s (9 Mirage 2000-5EDA fighters and 3 Mirage 2000-5DDA trainers) from Qatar is reportedly chosen by Indonesia. In November 2022, the Ministry of Finance of Indonesia approved foreign loans to fund several Indonesian Air Force procurement programs, including the ex-Qatari Mirage 2000s proposal. In June 2023, an Indonesian Ministry of Defense official confirmed a US$734.5 million contract was signed in January 2023 with Czech company Excalibur International, acting as the provider for the aircraft, to procure Qatar's fleet of Mirage 2000 aircraft. The purchase was criticized as being a stop-gap measure, especially when Indonesia has 42 Dassault Rafales on order. In January 2024, Indonesia postponed the acquisition of Mirage 2000 due to limited fiscal capacity. On 9 February 2024, spokesperson for the Minister of Defense confirmed the plan to acquire Mirages have been cancelled.

== Variants ==
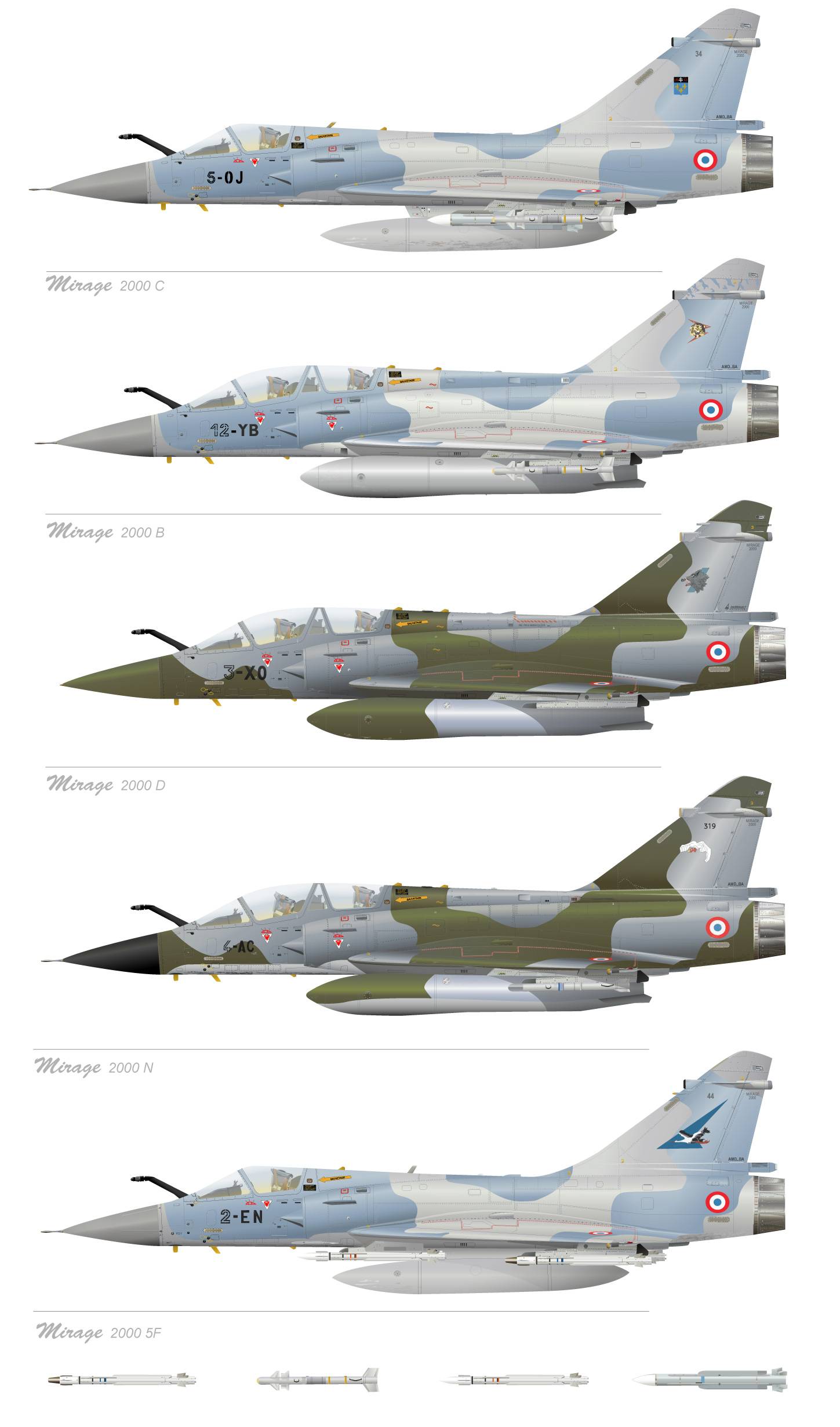
Mirage 2000 family (Mirage 2000 C/B/D/N/5F)

=== Mirage 2000C ===
Upgrades include the addition of the Non-Cooperative Target Recognition (NCTR) mode to the RDI Radar to allow identification of airborne targets not responding on identification friend or foe (IFF), and the ability to carry air-to-ground stores such as rocket pods, iron bombs and cluster bombs. Some variants, especially those equipped with the RDM radar (mainly used in export models) have the capability to use the Exocet anti-ship missile.

=== Mirage 2000B ===
The Mirage 2000B is a two-seat operational conversion trainer variant which first flew on 11 October 1980. The French Air Force acquired 30 Mirage 2000Bs, and all three AdA fighter wings each obtained several of them for conversion training.

=== Mirage 2000N ===
The Mirage 2000N is the nuclear strike variant which was intended to carry the Air-Sol Moyenne Portée nuclear stand-off missile. The variant was retired on 21 June 2018.

=== Mirage 2000D ===
The Mirage 2000D is a dedicated conventional attack variant developed from the Mirage 2000N.

Mirage 2000D RMV

Mirage 2000D Rénovation Mi-Vie (Mid-Life Upgrade). It updates the avionics, integrates a CC422 gun pod, the GBU-48, and the GBU-50, along with allowing use of MICA missiles in the place of Magic missiles.

=== Mirage 2000-5F ===
First major upgrade over the Mirage 2000C, it was designed only for France's defense needs (Thus the "F" designation). It entered limited service in 1997 with the upgraded RDY radar system. This addition allowed the aircraft to be equipped with MICA EM and IR long range missiles. The cockpit layout differs vastly from the 2000C, replacing most old-school dials with 2 side multi-function displays (VTLs, Visualisation Tête Latérales), 1 Head-Down Display (VTB, Visualisation Tête Basse) and 1 Head-Level Display (VTM, Visualisation Tête Moyenne). The 2000-5F specifically is the French variant used for air to air duties only. It does not retain any Air to ground capability from the 2000C, nor is it equipped to carry any ground attack weapon. In November 2024, France confirmed it will deliver six Mirage 2000-5F fighter jets to Ukraine in early 2025, along with a full support package. Ukraine has requested 12 aircraft to meet its immediate needs, Defence Minister Lecornu expanded on this stating that the jets will be upgraded with air-to-ground capabilities and enhanced electronic warfare systems at Cazaux Air Base in Gironde. This might mean the integration of the SCALP-EG missile, already in Ukrainian service.

The -5F production lots are divided as follows:

Mirage 2000-5F-SF1
The initial conversion standard for the French Air Force differs slightly from the Mirage 2000-5 baseline offered for export, most notably by omitting the two superheterodyne antennas on the tail fin retaining only the LAM (Liaison Missile-Avion) datalink antenna below the forward-facing jammer. The French standard self-protection suit comprising Serval, Sabre, and Spirale is retained with minor modifications. Armament is tailored for the air defense role, typically comprising four MICA missiles mounted on the fuselage pylons and two R.550 Magic II missiles on the outer stations. Once available, the IR-guided version of the MICA will replace the Magic missiles. Mounting weapons on the wing root pylons frees the inboard wing stations for two large RPL 541/542 fuel tanks. Combined with the standard RPL 522 centerline tank, this configuration increases endurance in the air defense role from 1.5 to 3 hours. The first squadron was scheduled to be declared operational in April 1999.
Mirage 2000-5F-SF2
This was a planned French Air Force upgrade program for its Mirage 2000-5F fleet, including the integration of GPS, a JTIDS-type data link, compatibility with helmet-mounted sights, and a yet unspecified long-range identification system, likely either optical or radar-based.

=== Mirage 2000-9 (Mirage 2000-5Mk2) ===
The Mirage 2000-9 is the export variant of Mirage 2000-5Mk2 (as it is known in Greek service). The UAE was the launch customer, ordering 32 newly-built aircraft: 20 Mirage 2000-9 single-seaters and 12 Mirage 2000-9D two-seaters. A further 30 of Abu Dhabi's older Mirage 2000s will also be upgraded to Mirage 2000-9 standard. This improved variant of the Mirage 2000-5 features the more advanced RDY-2 Radar (upgrading over the existing RDY Radar, adding synthetic aperture and beam-sharpening modes), the new multi-data processing unit (MDPU) replacing the old MC1 & MC2 Main-Computers and a new TOTEM 3000 INS using lasers (instead of the mechanical ULISS 52). Another upgrade (at least the Hellenic Air Force) M2000-5 Mk2 received is the new ICMS Mk3 Electronic Countermeasures system. LCD colour displays have been upgraded, plus provision for the integration of the Damocles laser-designation pod have been made. The Hellenic Air Force did not acquire the Mirage 2000-5F variant. Instead, it opted for the -9 version (re-designated as the 2000-5 Mk2), transitioning directly from the older Mirage 2000EG equipped with the RDM radar, to the more advanced RDY-2 system.

=== Mirage 2000E ===
"Mirage 2000E" was a blanket designation for a series of export variants of the Mirage 2000. These aircraft were fitted with the M53-P2 engine and an enhanced "RDM+" radar, and all can carry the day-only ATLIS II laser targeting pod.

Mirage 2000EM

The Mirage 2000M is the version purchased by Egypt. Two-seat Mirage 2000BM trainers were also ordered.

Mirage 2000H, 2000TH

Designation of two-seat trainers and single-seat fighters for India. Indian Mirage 2000s have been integrated to carry the Russian R-73E Archer missile as of 2007. The Mirage 2000TH is a twin-seat trainer version.

Mirage 2000I, 2000TI

It is an Indian specific version single/twin-seater fighter for the Indian Air Force similar to Mirage 2000-5 Mk2 equipped with Indian French and Israeli avionics and weapon packages. Its contract was signed in 2011 and first upgraded aircraft was delivered in 2015. Dassault Aviation will upgrade initial few planes Mirage 2000H, 2000TH to 2000I, 2000TI later by Hindustan Aeronautics Limited.

Mirage 2000P

Peru placed an order for 10 single-seat Mirage 2000Ps and 2 Mirage 2000DP trainers.

Mirage 2000-5EI

Of the 60 Mirage 2000s Taiwan ordered in 1992, the Republic of China Air Force (ROCAF) would receive 48 single-seat Mirage 2000-5EI interceptors and 12 Mirage 2000-5DI trainers. This version of Mirage 2000-5 had the mid-air refuel ability as well as its ground attack ability deleted.

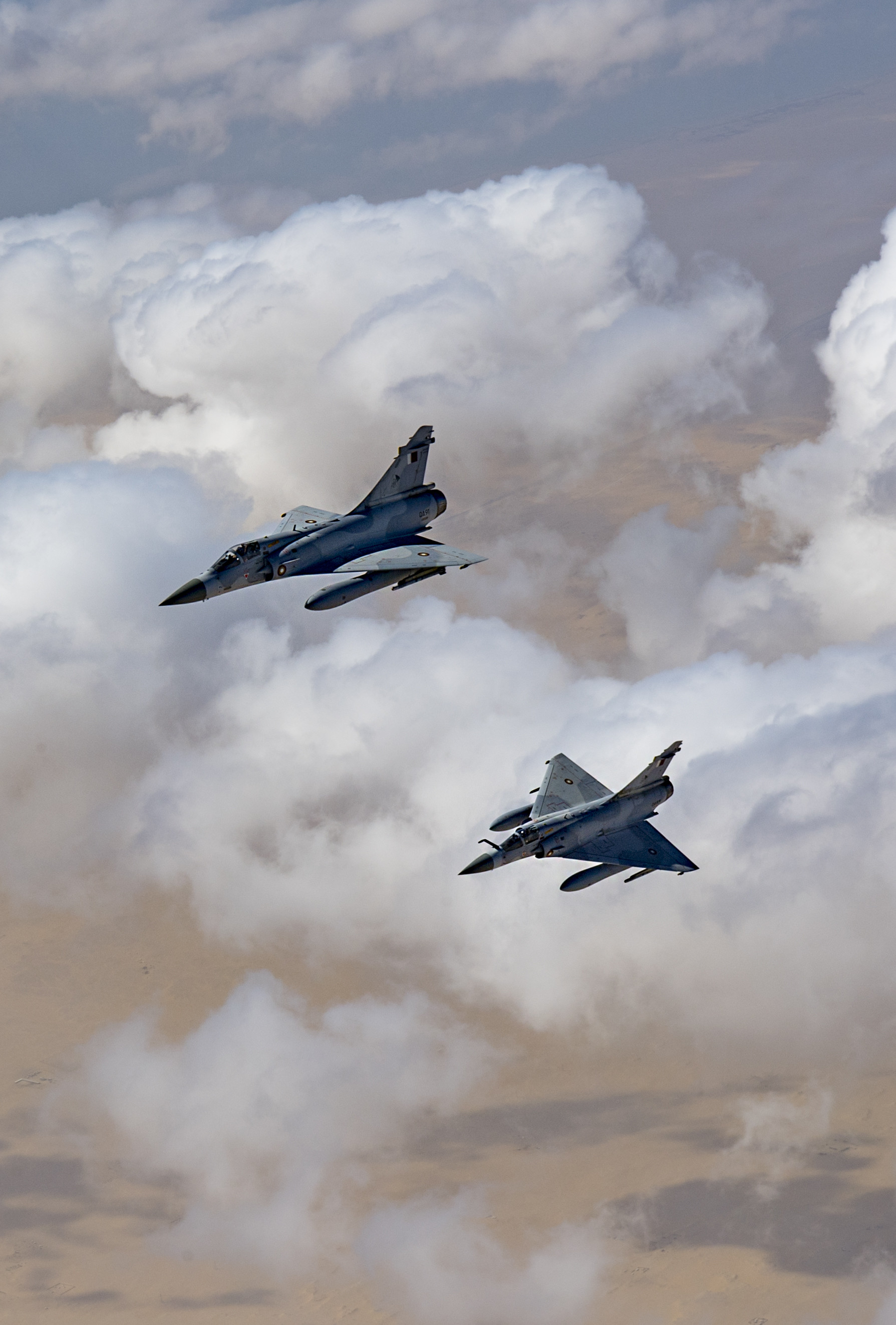
Qatari Mirage 2000

Mirage 2000-5EDA

In 1994, Qatar ordered nine single-seat Mirage 2000-5EDAs and three Mirage 2000-5DDA trainers, with initial deliveries starting in late 1997.

Mirage 2000EAD/RAD

In 1983, the United Arab Emirates (UAE) purchased 22 single-seat Mirage 2000EADs, 8 unique single-seat Mirage 2000RAD reconnaissance variants, and 6 Mirage 2000DAD trainers, for a total order of 36 aircraft.

The Mirage 2000RAD reconnaissance variant does not have any built-in cameras or sensors, and the aircraft can still be operated in air combat or strike roles. The reconnaissance systems are implemented in pods produced by Thales and Dassault. The UAE is the only nation operating such a specialised reconnaissance variant of the Mirage 2000 at this time.

Mirage 2000EG

In March 1985, Greece ordered 30 single-seat Mirage 2000EGs and 10 Mirage 2000BG two-seat trainers, equipped with RDM radars and M53P2 engines, mainly for interception/air defence roles, although the ability to use air-to-ground armaments was retained. After the Talos modernisation project, during which variant aircraft received updated sensors and avionics, as well as new anti-ship and air-to-air weapons, and were redesignated Mirage 2000EGM.

Mirage 2000BR

A variant of the Mirage 2000-9 for Brazil that did not materialise.

== Operators ==
=== Operators as per original production run ===
List of users and variants
France
Variant	Purpose	Number
2000C	Single-seat fighter	124
2000C	Updated to 2000-5F specs	37
2000D	Two-seat conventional strike	86 (55 RMV by 2024)
2000N	Two-seat nuclear strike	75
2000B	Two-seater with 2000C kit	30
Total		315
India
2000H	Upgraded to 2000I	42
2000TH	Two-seat trainer upgraded to 2000TI	8
Total		50
United Arab Emirates
2000EAD	Single-seat multirole	22
2000-9	Single-seat	19
2000-9D	Two-seat trainer	12
2000RAD	Unique reconnaissance variant	8
2000DAD	Two-seat trainer	6
Total		67
Taiwan
2000-5EI	Similar to 2000–5	44
2000-5DI	Similar to 2000-5D	9
Total		53
Greece
2000EG	Similar to 2000C. Retired in 2021	17
2000-5 Mk 2	Multirole fighter	25
2000BG	Two-seat trainer. Retired in 2021	2
Total		44
Egypt
2000EM	Similar to 2000C	16
2000BM	Two-seat trainer	4
Total		20
Brazil (retired)
2000C	Single-seat fighter	10
2000B	Two-seat trainer	2
Total		12
Qatar (retired)
2000-5EDA	Single-seat fighter	9
2000-5DDA	Two-seat trainer	3
Total		12
Peru
2000P	Single-seat multirole fighter	10
2000DP	Two-seat trainer	2
Total		12
Ukraine
2000-5F	Multirole fighter	?
Total		?
Total Produced	All variants	601

=== Current operators ===
Map with current operators of the Mirage 2000 in blue, former operators in red, and future operators in orange

As per World Air Forces 2024, the following nations operate the Mirage 2000 as of December 2023:

Egypt

- Egyptian Air Force: The Egyptian Air Force operates 19 Mirage 2000s. These are 15 Mirage 2000EM fighters and 4 Mirage 2000BM trainers.

France

- French Air and Space Force: The French Air Force operates 97 Mirage 2000s. This force comprises 65 Mirage 2000D fighters, 26 Mirage 2000-5F fighters, and 6 Mirage 2000B-S5 trainers.
- Procor: The private military firm operates up to 9 Mirage 2000s: 8 Mirage 2000C and 1 Mirage 2000B aircraft. These were purchased in 2019 from Brazil, and are used as aggressor aircraft.

Greece

- Hellenic Air Force: The Hellenic Air Force operates 29 Mirage 2000s, which consists of 5 Mirage 2000EG and 24 Mirage 2000-5/Mk II fighters. Some of these are also used for training. 18 may be sold to India.

India

- Indian Air Force: The Indian Air Force operates 55 Mirage 2000s: 44 single seater Mirage 2000H/I fighters and 11 twin seater Mirage 2000TH/TI trainers. India upgraded its entire fleet of the Mirage aircraft between the late 2010s and early 2020s to extend its operational life for another 20 to 25 years.

Peru

- Peruvian Air Force: The Peruvian Air Force operates 12 Mirage 2000s: 10 Mirage 2000P fighters and 2 Mirage 2000DP trainers.

Republic of China

- Republic of China Air Force: The Republic of China Air Force operates 53 Mirage 2000s. This force comprises 44 Mirage 2000-5EI fighters and 9 Mirage 2000-5DI trainers.

Ukraine

- Ukrainian Air Force: Mirage 2000-5 donated by France. On 6 February 2025, the first ex-French Mirage 2000-5s fighters have arrived in Ukraine. These aircraft are capable of carrying SCALP EG, MICA missiles and AASM stand-off munitions; they also have updated electronic warfare systems.

United Arab Emirates

- United Arab Emirates Air Force: The UAE Air Force operates 59 Mirage 2000s, consisting of 44 Mirage 2000-9/EAD/RAD fighters and 15 Mirage 2000-9DAD trainers.

=== Former operators ===
Brazil

- Brazilian Air Force: The Brazilian Air Force had 11 or 12 Mirage 2000s, consisting of 9 or 10 Mirage 2000C fighters and 2 Mirage 2000B trainers. These were second hand aircraft purchased from France in 2005. These aircraft were retired in December 2013, and were replaced with Saab JAS 39 Gripen aircraft. Subsequently, in 2019, Brazil sold nine Mirage 2000s (8 Mirage 2000C and 1 Mirage 2000B) to the French company Procor, which uses them as aggressor aircraft for training.

Qatar

- Qatari Emiri Air Force: The Qatari Emiri Air Force previously operated 12 Mirage 2000s, consisting of nine Mirage 2000-5EDA fighters and three Mirage 2000-5DDA trainers.

== Specifications (Mirage 2000) ==
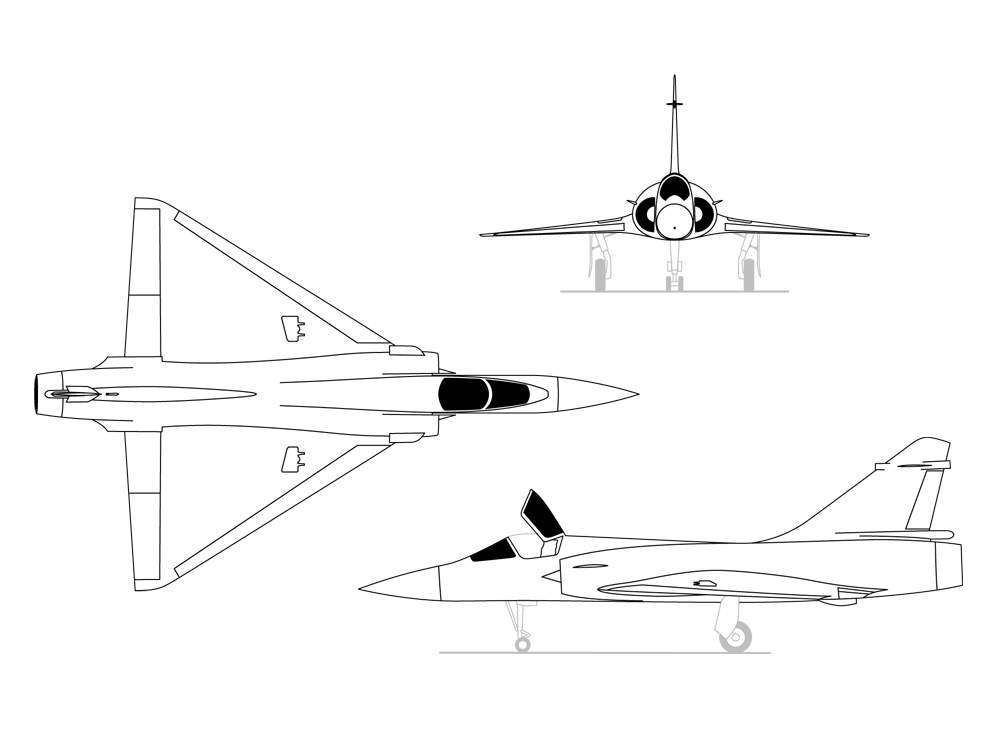
3-view of Mirage 2000C/RDI

Data from Complete Encyclopedia of World Aircraft, International Directory of Military Aircraft

General characteristics

- Crew: 1
- Length: 14.36 m (47 ft 1 in)
- Wingspan: 9.13 m (29 ft 11 in)
- Height: 5.2 m (17 ft 1 in)
- Wing area: 41 m^{2} (440 sq ft)
- Empty weight: 7,500 kg (16,535 lb)
- Gross weight: 13,800 kg (30,424 lb)
- Max takeoff weight: 17,000 kg (37,479 lb)
- Fuel capacity: 3,950 L internal / 8,000 L maximum
- Powerplant: 1 × SNECMA M53-P2 afterburning turbofan engine, 64.3 kN (14,500 lbf) thrust dry, 95.1 kN (21,400 lbf) with afterburner

Performance

- Maximum speed: 2,336 km/h (1,452 mph, 1,261 kn) / Mach 2.2 at high altitude

1,110 km/h (690 mph; 600 kn) at sea level

- Range: 1,550 km (960 mi, 840 nmi)
- Ferry range: 3,335 km (2,072 mi, 1,801 nmi) with auxiliary fuel
- Service ceiling: 17,060 m (55,970 ft)
- Rate of climb: 285 m/s (56,100 ft/min)
- Wing loading: 337 kg/m^{2} (69 lb/sq ft)
- Thrust/weight: 0.7

Armament

- Guns: 2× 30 mm (1.2 in) DEFA 554 revolver cannon, 125 rounds per gun
- Hardpoints: nine total (four under-wing and five under-fuselage) with a capacity of 6,300 kg (13,900 lb) external fuel and ordnance
- Rockets: Matra 68 mm unguided rocket pods, 18 rockets per pod
- Missiles:
  - Air-to-air missiles:
    - 6 × MBDA MICA IR/RF (Mirage 2000-5, Mirage 2000-9, Mirage 2000 I)
    - 2 × Matra R550 Magic-II and 2× Matra Super 530D (Mirage 2000 C, Mirage 2000 H)
  - Air-to-surface missiles:
    - 2 × AM.39 Exocet (Mirage 2000 EG, Mirage 2000-5 Mk2)
    - 1 × SCALP EG (Mirage 2000 D, Mirage 2000-5)
    - Crystal Maze
    - Crystal Maze II
- Bombs:
  - Unguided:
    - Mk.82
  - Guided:
    - PGM 500 and PGM 2000 modular guided bombs (Mirage 2000-9)
    - 2 × AS-30L laser-guided missile (Mirage 2000 D)
    - 2 × GBU-12 laser-guided bombs (Mirage 2000 D, Mirage 2000 C & Mirage 2000 N with external laser designation)
    - 1 × GBU-16 laser-guided bomb (Mirage 2000 D, Mirage 2000 C & Mirage 2000 N with external laser designation)
    - 1 × GBU-24 laser-guided bomb (Mirage 2000 D, Mirage 2000 C & Mirage 2000 N with external laser designation)
    - 2 × GBU-49 laser-guided bombs (Mirage 2000 D)
    - 1 × ASMP-A tactical nuclear cruise missile (Mirage 2000 N)
    - 1 × Spice 2000 (Mirage 2000 N)
    - Smart Anti-Airfield Weapon
    - AASM Hammer smart air-to-surface stand-off weapon

Avionics

- Thomson-CSF RDM (Radar Doppler Multifunctiont) radar (early Mirage 2000C) .
- Thomson-CSF RDI (Radar Doppler à Impulsions) radar (Late Mirage 2000C, until S5 specification).
- Thomson-CSF RDY (Radar Doppler Multi-target) radar (Mirage 2000-5, Mirage 2000 I).

== See also ==
Related development

- Dassault Mirage 2000N/2000D
- Dassault Mirage 4000

Comparable aircraft

- General Dynamics F-16 Fighting Falcon
- Mikoyan MiG-29
- McDonnell Douglas F/A-18 Hornet

Related lists

- List of fighter aircraft
- List of military aircraft of France
