= Radar Doppler Multitarget =

Type of multimode aircraft radar

Radar Doppler Multitarget (RDY in its French acronym) is a multimode Look-down/shoot-down Pulse-Doppler radar designed by Thomson-CSF (now Thales) for the Mirage 2000-5 fighter. The RDY-3 derivative has been fitted to Moroccan Mirage F1s. Thomson has claimed that the original RDY outperformed the AN/APG-66/68 of the F-16 and the AN/APG-65 of the F/A-18 Hornet.

== Design ==
The original RDI/RDM radars on the Mirage 2000 only worked in air-to-air mode. The RDY was designed to add air-to-ground modes, in particular the ability to control Exocet and Kormoran 2 anti-shipping missiles. The 240 kg (530 lb) system has a 655 mm (25.8 in) flat-plate antenna scanning a 3.5° beam over a 60° cone at powers up to 120 kW. Maximum range is 60 nmi (110 km) in air-to-air mode and 20 nmi (37 km) in look-down mode. The RDY can detect 24 targets, track eight of them and engage four targets at a time. The enhanced RDY-2 has a slightly greater range and adds a SAR mode.

== History ==
Development began in 1984, with the first of nine prototypes flying in July 1987 in a Mystère 20, and the first delivery of a production set in December 1994.

RDY is the standard fit on the Mirage 2000–5,-5Mk2 (RDY-2) and -9 (RDY-2) aircraft and has been retrofitted aboard 37 French Air Force Mirage 2000Cs (aircraft to Mirage 2000-5F standard; 11 aircraft redelivered during 1998, 22 during 1999), 25 Greek Mirage 2000-5 Mk2 and 62 United Arab Emirates' Mirage 2000EAD/DADs. Other customers for the Mirage 2000-5 include Qatar (Mirage 2000-5EDA and -5DDA aircraft) and Taiwan (Mirage 2000-5Ei and -5Di aircraft). India's fleet will receive RDY-2 under a €1.47bn contract signed in July 2011 to upgrade them to 2000-5 standard.

As part of the MF2000 upgrade, 27 Mirage F1 of the Royal Moroccan Air Force are being fitted with the Thales RC400 (RDY-3 or RDC), a derivative of the RDY with an antenna sized to fit the smaller aircraft.

== Specification ==
- Frequency:8 to 12 GHz
- Band: I/J

== See also ==
- RBE2 - Radar à Balayage Electronique 2, radar on the Rafale
