= Cathedral of Our Lady of China =

Cathedral in Taiwan

- The Cathedral of the Diocese of Tainan
- 中 華 聖 母 主 教 座 堂
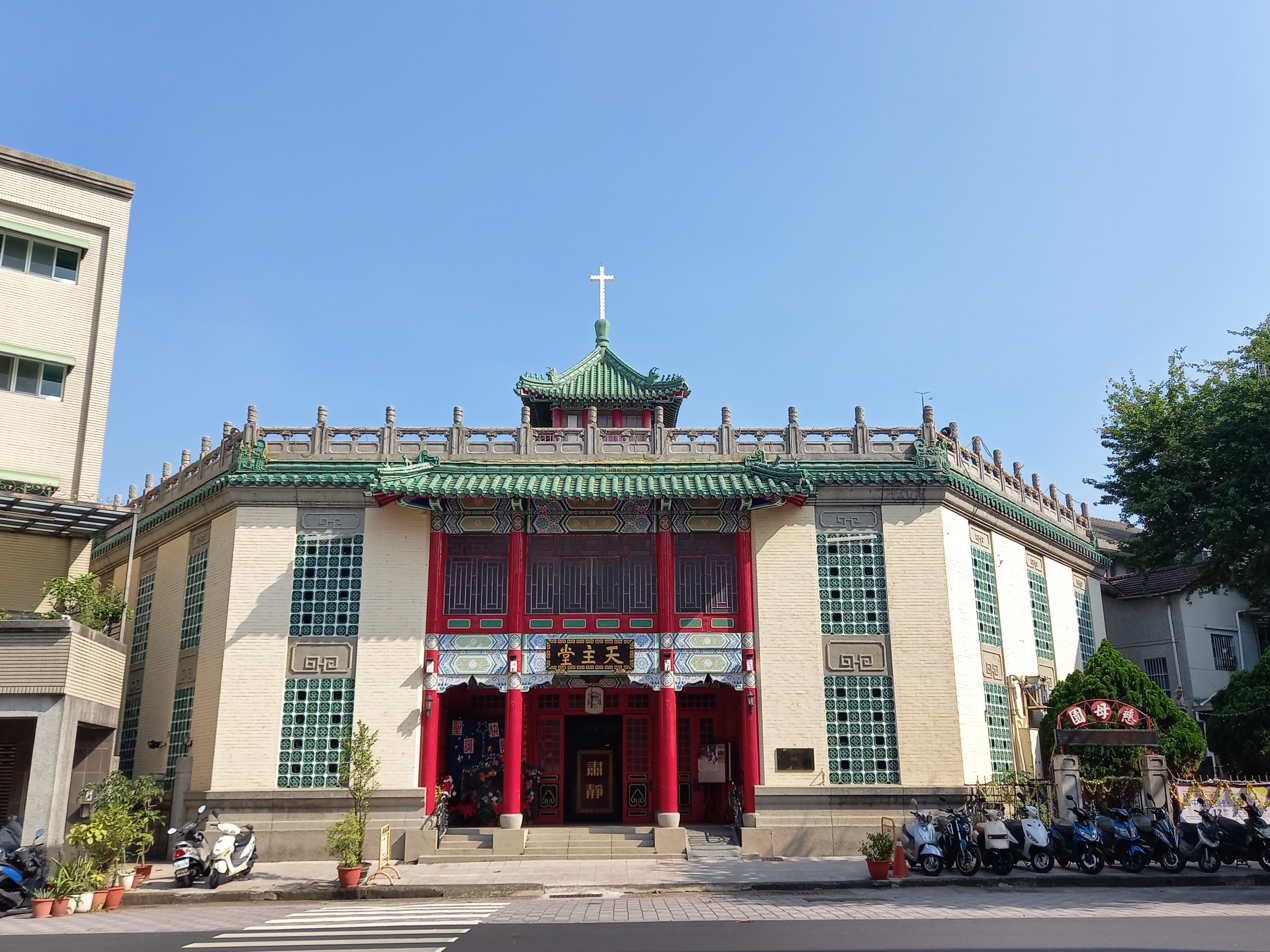
- The cathedral
- Cathedral of Our Lady of China
- 22.986858°N 120.209373°E
- Location: 195號, Kaishan Road, West Central District, Tainan City, Taiwan
- Country: Taiwan
- Denomination: Catholic Church

History
- Status: Cathedral
- Founded: 19 March 1964; 62 years ago
- Founder: Stanislaus Lo Kuang
- Dedication: Our Lady of China
- Dedicated: 19 March 1964

Architecture
- Functional status: Active
- Architectural type: Chinese Architecture
- Style: Palatial

Administration
- Archdiocese: Roman Catholic Archdiocese of Taipei
- Diocese: Roman Catholic Diocese of Tainan
- Parish: Diocese of Tainan

Clergy
- Archbishop: Thomas Chung An-Zu
- Bishop: John Baptist Huang Min-Cheng

The Cathedral of Our Lady of China (Chinese: 中華聖母主教座堂) is located in Tainan city, Taiwan and serves as the cathedral for the Diocese of Tainan, Taiwan.

It is dedicated to the Blessed Virgin Mary under the venerated title of Our Lady of China. The design of the church is a palatial Chinese architecture.

== History ==
The original cathedral was built in 1963 by the former Archbishop of Taipei, Stanislaus Lokuang, who was the first bishop of Tainan. It was dedicated on 19 March 1964 by Archbishop Giuseppe Caprio, Apostolic Internuncio to China.

== Chinese architecture ==
The cathedral is built in ancient Chinese palatial architecture which artistically resembles to the Taoist temples.

== Dedication ==
The cathedral is dedicated to the Marian apparition of Our Lady of China during the Boxer Rebellion in 1900.

== See also ==
- List of cathedrals in Taiwan
- Christianity in Taiwan
