= Philip Huang Chao-ming =

Taiwanese Catholic priest

His Excellency, The Most Reverend Philip Huang Chao-ming
- Bishop of Hualien
- Archdiocese: Taipei
- Diocese: Hualien
- Appointed: 19 November 2001
- Predecessor: Andrew Tsien Chih-ch'un
- Successor: Incumbent
- Previous posts: Auxiliary Bishop of Kaohsiung (1998-2001), Titular Bishop of Lamphua (1998-2001)

Orders
- Ordination: 12 April 1983
- Consecration: 26 September 1998 by Paul Shan Kuo-hsi

Personal details
- Born: 黃兆明; 12 April 1951 (age 75) Chiayi, Taiwan
- Denomination: Roman Catholic
- Motto: FIDELIS AC DEVOTUS

Philip Huang Chao-ming (Chinese: 黃兆明; pinyin: Huáng Zhàomíng; born 23 August 1954) is the fourth and current Roman Catholic bishop of Hualien. He was ordained a priest in 1983. He became bishop of Hualien in 2001.

Catholic Church titles
Preceded by Andrew Tsien Chih-ch'un	Bishop of Hualien; 2001 – present	Incumbent
