= Diocese of Hualien =

Roman Catholic diocese in Taiwan

Coordinates: 23.9903°N 121.6252°E

Diocese of Hualien Dioecesis Hvalienensis 天主教花蓮教區
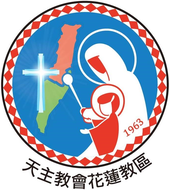

Location
- Country: Taiwan
- Territory: Counties of Hualien and Taitung
- Ecclesiastical province: Taipei

Statistics
- Population: Total; Catholics: 586,241; 56,810 (9.7%)
- Parishes: 47

Information
- Denomination: Roman Catholic
- Sui iuris church: Latin Church
- Rite: Roman Rite
- Cathedral: Cathedral of Our Lady Help of Christians in Hualien City
- Patron saint: Our Lady Help of Christians
- Secular priests: 27

Current leadership
- Pope: Leo XIV
- Bishop: Philip Huang Chao-ming
- Metropolitan Archbishop: Thomas Chung An-Zu
- Vicar General: Peter Chen Chung-kuang
- Bishops emeritus: John Baptist Danglo Kingzi (Auxiliary Bishop Emeritius)

Map
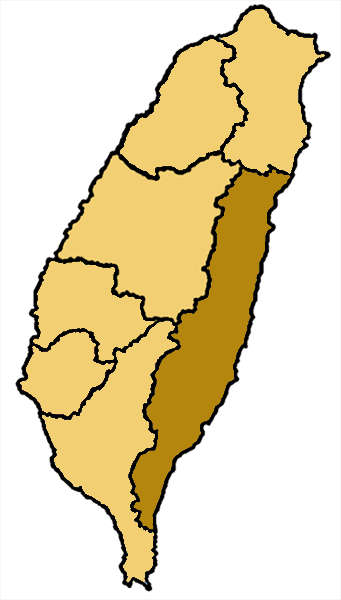

Website
- Website of the diocese

The Diocese of Hualien (Latin: Dioecesis Hvalienensis) is a Latin Church diocese of the Catholic Church in Taiwan.

Erected as the Apostolic Prefecture of Hualien in 1952, the prefecture was elevated to a full diocese, in 1963. The diocese is suffragan to the Archdiocese of Taipei.

The current bishop is Philip Huang Chao-ming, appointed in November 2001.

== Statistics ==
Catholics are 10.3% (56,401) of the total population (548,870).

== Ordinaries ==
- Matthew Kia Yen-wen (14 Dec 1974 appointed – 15 Nov 1978 appointed, Archbishop of Taipei)
- Paul Shan Kuo-hsi, S.J. (15 Nov 1979 appointed – 4 Mar 1991 appointed, Bishop of Kaohsiung)
- Andrew Tsien Chih-ch'un (23 Jan 1992 appointed – 19 Nov 2001 retired)
- Philip Huang Chao-ming (19 Nov 2001 appointed – )

== See also ==
- Catholic Church in Taiwan
