= Bosco Lin Chi-nan =

Most Reverend Bosco Lin Chi-nan
- Apostolic Administrator of Tainan; Bishop Emeritus of Tainan
- Native name: 林吉男
- Archdiocese: Taipei
- Diocese: Tainan
- Appointed: 24 January 2004
- Term ended: 14 November 2020
- Predecessor: Joseph Cheng Tsai-fa
- Successor: John Lee Juo-wang

Orders
- Ordination: 6 January 1973
- Consecration: 2 January 1993 by Paul Shan Kuo-hsi

Personal details
- Born: 14 May 1943 (age 83) Karenkō Prefecture, Japanese Taiwan
- Denomination: Roman Catholic
- Motto: 主内合一

Bosco Lin Chi-nan is a Chinese prelate of the Catholic Church who was bishop of Tainan from 2004 to 2020. He was auxiliary bishop of Kaohsiung from 1992 to 2004.

== Biography ==
Bosco was born in Hualien, Taiwan on 14 May 1943. He was ordained a Catholic priest on 6 January 1973.

On 28 September 1992, Bosco was appointed Auxiliary Bishop of the diocese of Kaohsiung, Taiwan, and Titular Bishop of Alexanum and consecrated a bishop on 2 January 1993 by Bishop Paul Shan Kuo-hsi. He was appointed bishop of the diocese of Tainan on 24 January 2004 by Pope John Paul II. His retirement was accepted on 14 November 2020.

On 19 June 2021, Pope Francis named him apostolic administrator of the Diocese of Tainan, following the resignation of Bishop John Lee Juo-wang after less than six months.
