= St. John's Cathedral, Chiayi =

Cathedral in East, Chiayi City, Taiwan

Coordinates: 23.4842°N 120.4611°E

St. John's Cathedral
- 聖若望主教座堂
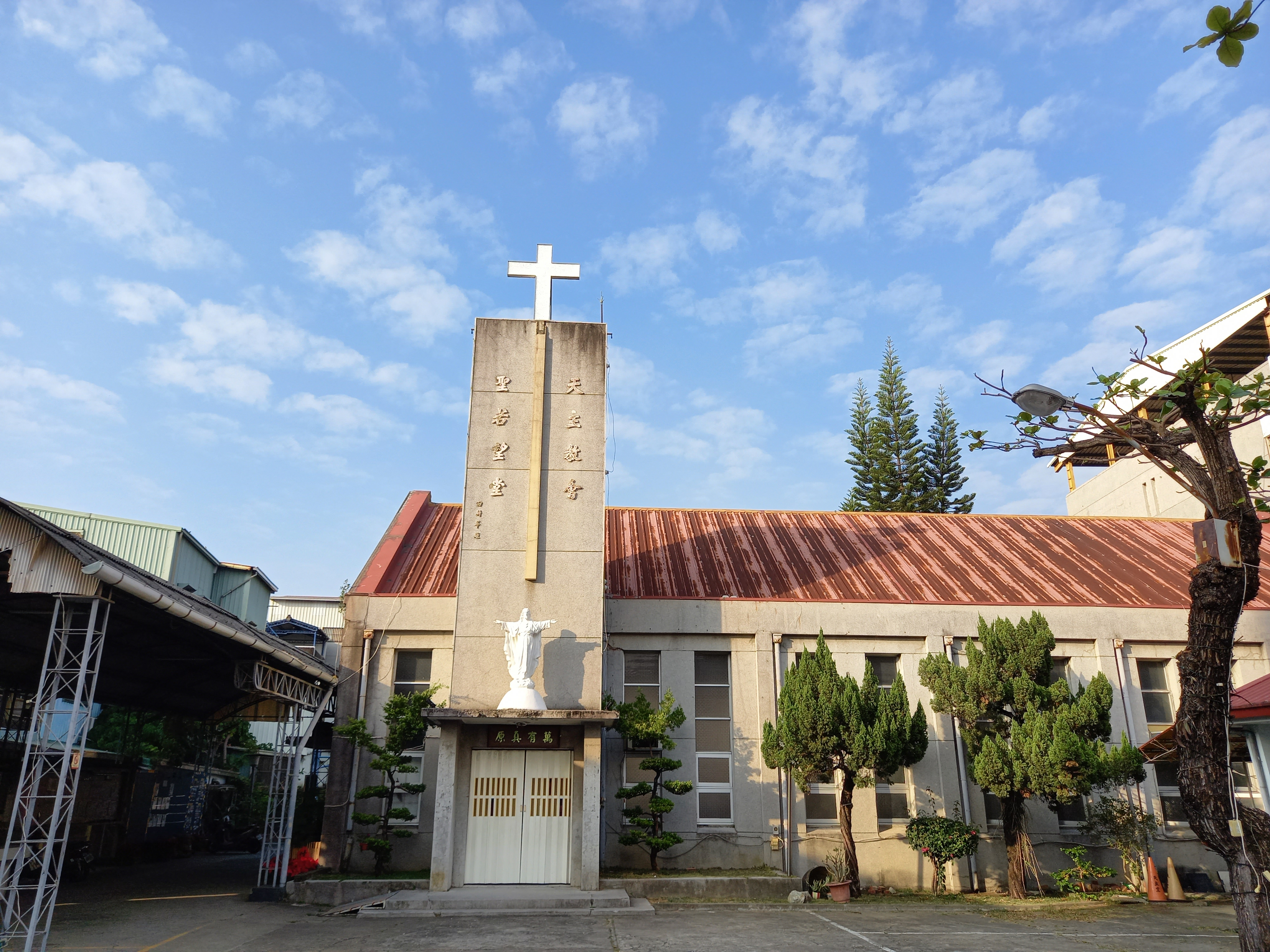
- St. John's Cathedral
- Location: East, Chiayi City, Taiwan
- Country: Taiwan
- Denomination: Roman Catholic Church

History
- Status: Cathedral
- Founded: 1958; 68 years ago

Architecture
- Functional status: Active
- Years built: 1957-1958
- Groundbreaking: 1957
- Completed: 1958

Administration
- Archdiocese: Roman Catholic Archdiocese of Taipei
- Diocese: Roman Catholic Diocese of Chiayi

Clergy
- Archbishop: Thomas Chung An-Zu
- Bishop: Vacant

The Cathedral of Saint John in Chiayi, also known as St. John's Cathedral (traditional Chinese: 聖若望主教座堂; simplified Chinese: 圣若望主教座堂; pinyin: Shèngruò Wàngzhǔjiào Zuòtáng) is the cathedral church of the Roman Catholic Diocese of Chiayi. It is located at 62nd Street Minchuan, East District, Chiayi City, Taiwan.

It is the mother church for Roman Rite worshipers in the diocese of Chiayi, also written Kiayi or (Dioecesis Kiayiensis; 天主教嘉義教區) which was raised to its current status in 1962 by the bull Cum Apostolica by Pope John XXIII. It is under the pastoral responsibility of Bishop Thomas Chung An-zu.

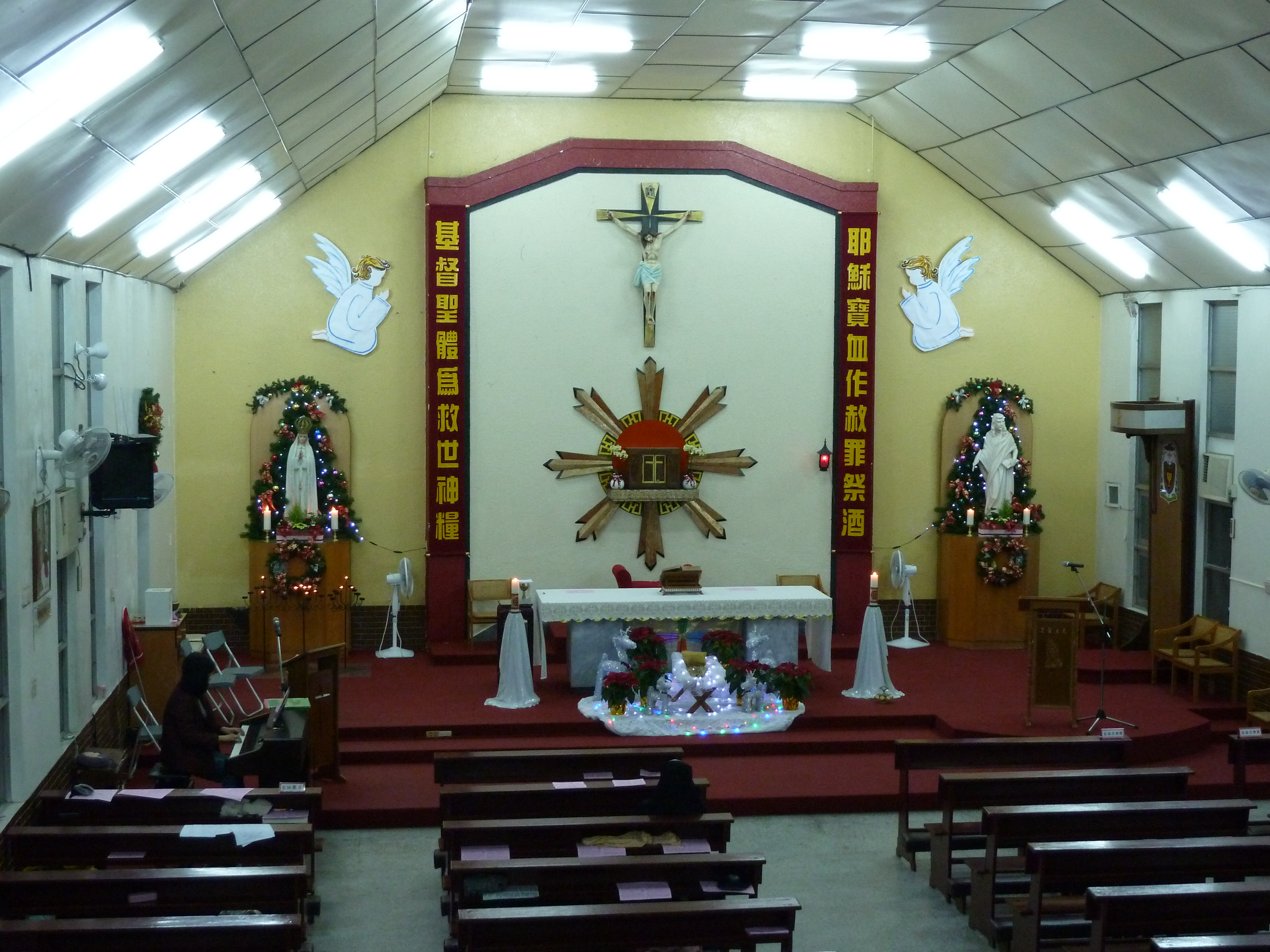
Internal view

The current cathedral was built between 1957 and 1958. It has been renovated several times especially after the 1964 Baihe earthquake, after by several floods and typhoons, and a small fire that occurred in 1997.

== See also ==
- Chinese Rites Controversy
- Catholic Church in Taiwan
