= List of cathedrals in Taiwan =

This is the list of cathedrals in Taiwan sorted by denomination.

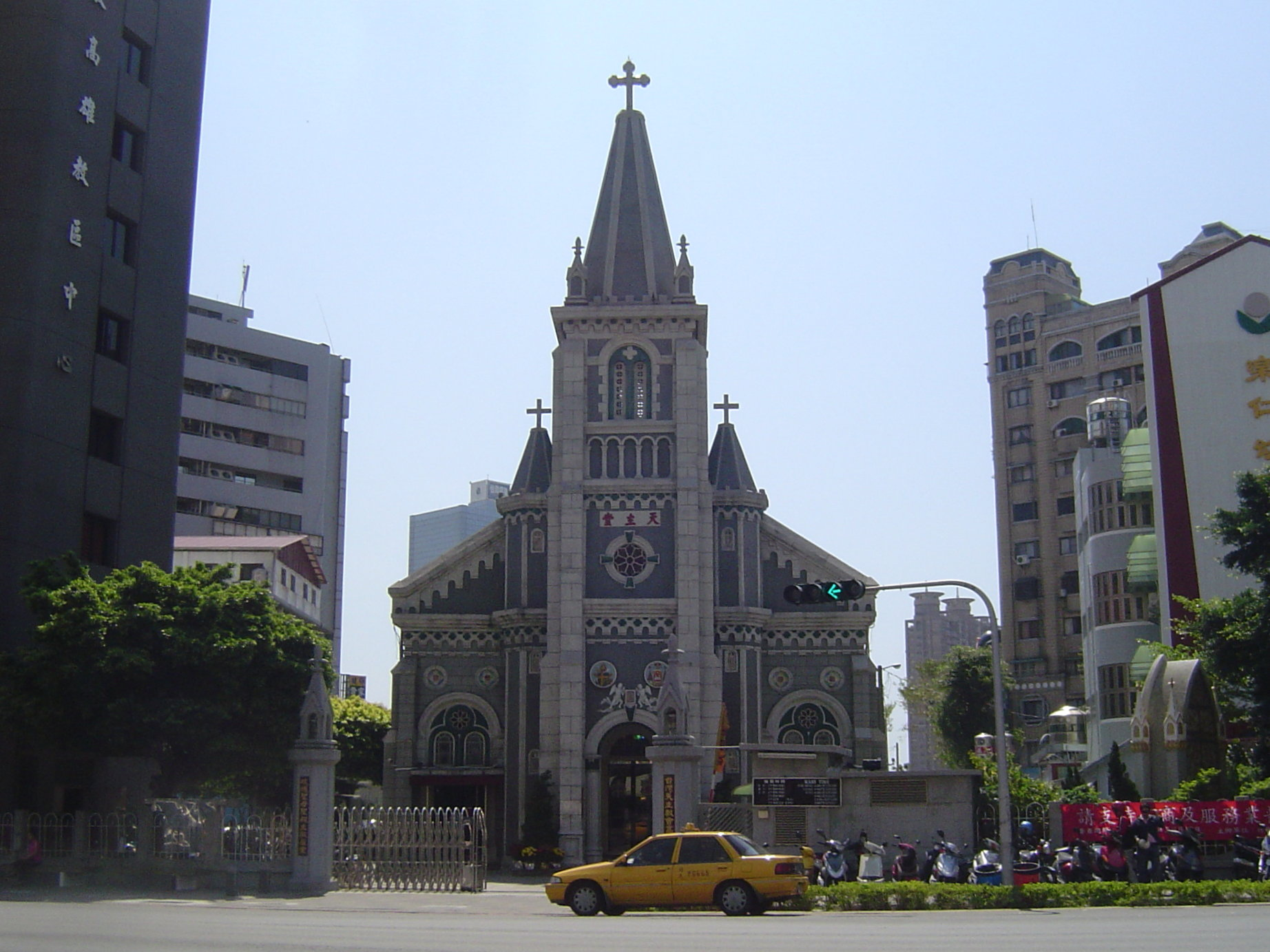
Cathedral of Our Lady of the Temple Rose in Kaohsiung.

== Roman Catholic ==
Cathedrals of the Catholic Church in Taiwan:

- Cathedral of Our Lady of the Sacred Heart in Hsinchu City
- Mary Help of Christians Cathedral in Hualien City
- Cathedral of Our Lady of the Temple Rose in Kaohsiung
- Cathedral of St. John in Chiayi City
- Cathedral of Christ the Saviour in Taichung
- Cathedral of Our Lady of China in Tainan
- Cathedral of the Immaculate Conception in Taipei

== Anglican ==
Cathedrals of the Episcopal Church:

- St. John's Cathedral in Taipei

== See also ==
- List of cathedrals
- Christianity in Taiwan
