= Norbert Pu Ying-hsiung =

Taiwanese Roman Catholic Bishops

Most Reverend Norbert Pu Ying-hsiung
- Bishop of Chiayi
- Native name: Pasuya Poicongʉ
- Church: Catholic Church; Latin Church
- Diocese: Chiayi
- Appointed: 15 February 2022
- Predecessor: Thomas Chung An-Zu
- Successor: Incumbent
- Previous post: Priest of the Diocese of Chiayi

Orders
- Ordination: 1 January 1987
- Consecration: 2 April 2022 by Thomas Chung An-Zu

Personal details
- Born: Pasuya Poicong Ü 26 August 1958 (age 68) Alishan, Chiayi, Taiwan
- Education: Saint Augustin University, Germany
- Motto: PATIENS ET MISERICORS / 寬仁慈悲
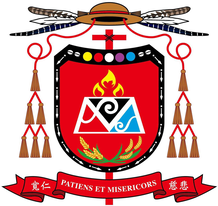
- Coat of arms

Norbert Pu Ying-hsiung (Pasuya Poicongʉ) is a Taiwanese Roman Catholic prelate serving as the current bishop of the Roman Catholic Diocese of Chiayi appointed by Pope Francis on 15 February 2022.

== Early life and education ==
Bishop Poicongʉ was born to a Tsou family on 26 August 1958 in Alishan, Chiayi, Taiwan. He completed his bachelor's degree in philosophy and theology from the Faculty of Theology Saint Robert Bellarmine of the Fu Jen Catholic University. He also acquired a master's degree in theology from Saint Augustin University in Germany.

== Priesthood ==
Bishop Poicongʉ was ordained a priest on 1 January 1987.

== Episcopate ==
On 15 February 2022, Pope Francis appointed Norbert as the bishop of the Roman Catholic Diocese of Chiayi. He was Ordained a bishop on 2 April 2022 by Thomas Chung An-zu. He is the first Catholic bishop of Indigenous descent.
