= Peter Chao Yung-Chi =

Taiwanese Roman Catholic bishop (born 1973)

Most Reverend Peter Chao Yung-Chi
- Auxiliary Bishop of Taipei; Titular Bishop of Rusguniæ
- Native name: 趙永吉
- Church: Roman Catholic Church
- Diocese: Taipei

Orders
- Ordination: 3 February 2001
- Consecration: 3 April 2025

Personal details
- Born: 28 March 1973 (age 53) Taichung, Taiwan
- Education: Fu Jen Catholic University
- Motto: Mitis et humilis corde

Peter Chao Yung-Chi is a Roman Catholic prelate from Taiwan. He was appointed Auxiliary Bishop of the Roman Catholic Archdiocese of Taipei, Taiwan and Titular Bishop of Rusguniæ on 5 February 2025 by Pope Francis.

== Early life and education ==
Peter was born on 28 March 1973 in Taichung, Taiwan. He acquired a bachelor's degree in philosophy and theology from Saint Robert Bellarmine. He also holds a licentiate in religious studies from the Fu Jen Catholic University, Taiwan.

== Priesthood ==
He was ordained a diocesan priest on 3 February 2001 for the Roman Catholic diocese of Chiayi, Taiwan.

== Episcopate ==
He was appointed Auxiliary Bishop of the Roman Catholic Archdiocese of Taipei, Taiwan and Titular Bishop of Rusguniae on 5 Feb 2025 by Pope Francis. He will be ordained bishop on 3 April 2025.
