= Peter Liu Cheng-chung =

Taiwanese Catholic archbishop

His Grace, The Most Reverend Peter Liu Cheng-chung
- Archbishop-Bishop of Kaohsiung
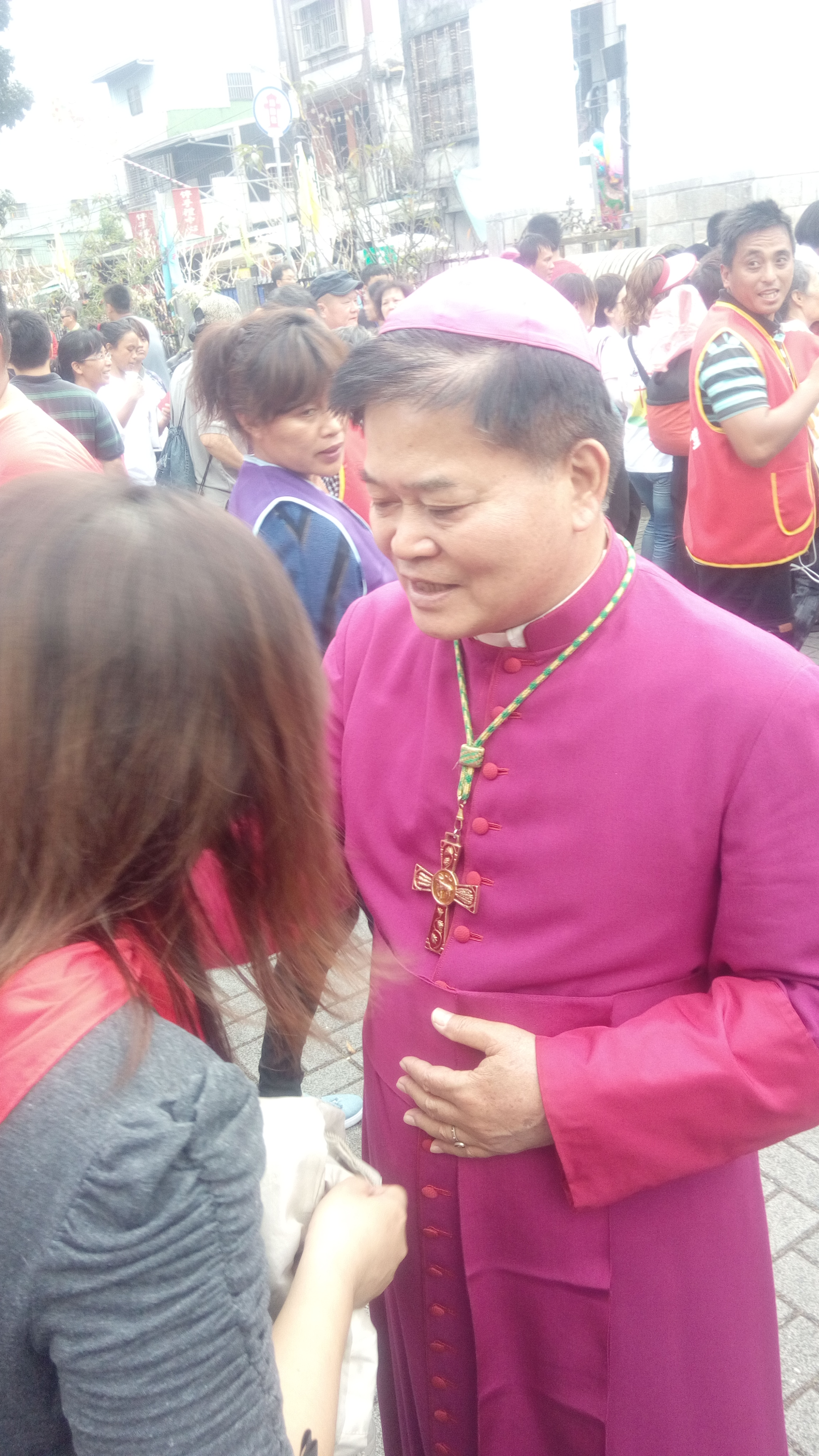
- Archdiocese: Taipei
- Diocese: Kaohsiung
- Appointed: 5 January 2006
- Predecessor: Paul Shan Kuo-hsi
- Successor: Incumbent

Orders
- Ordination: 13 April 1980
- Consecration: 28 September 1994 by Jozef Tomko

Personal details
- Born: 劉振忠; 12 April 1951 (age 75) Chiayi, Taiwan
- Denomination: Roman Catholic
- Motto: Fidelis ac devotus
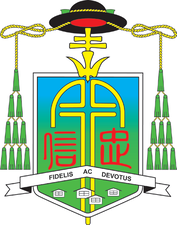
- Coat of arms

Styles of Peter Liu Cheng-chung
- Reference style: The Most Reverend
- Spoken style: Your Excellency
- Religious style: Monsignor

Peter Liu Cheng-chung is a Roman Catholic prelate of the Roman Catholic Diocese of Kaohsiung, Taiwan.

Peter Liu has been chairman of Fu Jen Catholic University since 2009.

== Early life ==
Liu was born on 12 April 1951 in Chiayi, Taiwan.

== Priesthood ==
On 13 April 1980, Liu was ordained a Catholic priest.

== Episcopate ==
Liu was appointed bishop of the Roman Catholic Diocese of Chiayi on 1 July 1994 and consecrated on 28 September 1994 Jozef Tomko. On 5 July 2004 he was appointed Coadjutor Bishop of the Roman Catholic Diocese of Kaohsiung and succeeded as bishop of the same diocese on 5 January 2006. He was appointed the Bishop of the Roman Catholic Diocese of Kaohsiung on 21 November 2009 as an Archbishop ad personam.
