= John Lee Juo-wang =

Taiwanese bishop of the Roman Catholic Church

Most Reverend John Lee Juo-wang
- Bishop Emeritus of Tainan
- Native name: 李若望
- Archdiocese: Taipei
- Diocese: Tainan
- Appointed: 14 November 2020
- Term ended: 19 June 2021
- Predecessor: Bosco Lin Chi-nan
- Successor: John Baptist Huang Min-Cheng

Orders
- Ordination: 1 January 1993
- Consecration: 1 January 2021 by Bosco Lin Chi-nan

Personal details
- Born: 2 November 1966 (age 59) Tainan, Taiwan
- Denomination: Roman Catholic
- Education: Pontifical Urban University
- Motto: 悔改、順服、見證

John Lee Juo-Wang (born 2 November 1966) is a Taiwanese prelate of the Catholic Church who was the bishop of Tainan, Taiwan, for less than six months in 2021.

He was the first native of Taiwan consecrated a bishop in 30 years.

== Biography ==
John was born on 2 November 1966 in Tainan city, Taiwan, to parents who arrived in Taiwan in the 1950s as refugees from mainland China. One of nine siblings, he was given up for adoption; the first family that adopted him had financial problems and he was then adopted a second time by a family that raised him as a Catholic. He attended Salesian High School in Tainan and entered minor seminary at the age of 12. He studied philosophy and theology at St. Pius X Seminary in Tainan.

On 1 January 1993, John was ordained a priest for the Tainan Diocese. Tainan Cathedral Parish as assistant parish priest (1993–96) and Holy Name of Jesus Parish as parish priest (1996–99). After earning a licentiate degree in dogmatic theology at the Pontifical Urban University in Rome, he returned to Tainan and served as parish priest of the Causa Nostrae Laetitiae Shrine and of St. Joseph's Church. He was president of the Commission for the Promotion of Vocations, became chancellor of the diocese in 2017 and its vicar general in 2019.

John was appointed fifth bishop of the Tainan by Pope Francis on 14 November 2020 and consecrated a bishop on 1 January 2021 by Bishop Bosco Lin Chi-nan.

Pope Francis accepted his resignation on 19 June 2021. John told the diocese that he resigned because of "serious psychological and physical problems".
