= Joseph Ti Kang =

Taiwanese bishop (1928–2022)

The Most Reverend Joseph Ti Kang
- Archbishop Emeritus of Taipei
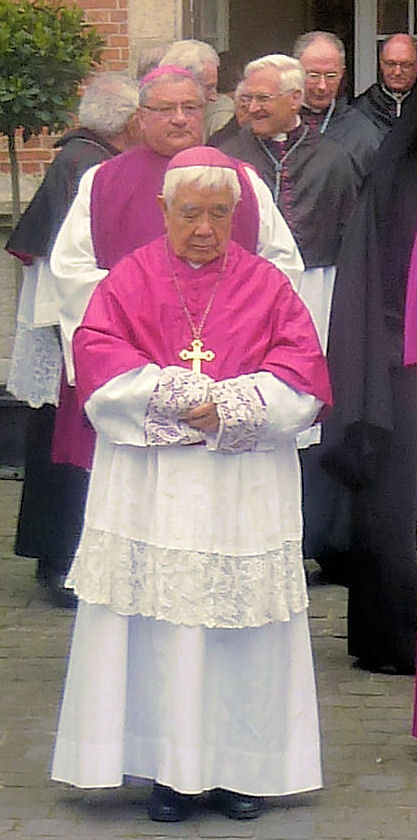
- Native name: 狄剛
- Installed: 11 February 1989
- Term ended: 24 January 2004
- Predecessor: Matthew Kia Yen-wen
- Successor: Joseph Cheng Tsai-fa
- Other posts: Apostolic Administrator of Kinmen or Quemoy Islands and Matzu (1989–2004)
- Previous post: Bishop of Chiayi (1975–1985)

Orders
- Ordination: 20 December 1953
- Consecration: 22 July 1975 by Agnelo Rossi

Personal details
- Born: 7 May 1928 Xinxiang County, China
- Died: 29 December 2022 (aged 94)
- Motto: COR UNIUM IN PATRE
- Coat of arms

Styles of Joseph Ti Kang
- Reference style: His Excellency; The Most Reverend
- Spoken style: Your Excellency
- Religious style: Archbishop

Joseph Ti Kang (Chinese: 狄剛; pinyin: Dí Gāng; 7 May 1928 – 29 December 2022) was a Taiwanese Roman Catholic prelate who served as the archbishop of Taipei from 1989 to 2004. He was born in Xinxiang, China. He became Bishop of Kiayi, and was succeeded by Bishop Joseph Cheng Tsai-fa, who was originally Bishop of Tainan.

Ti-kang served as the chairman of Fu Jen Catholic University from 1993 to 1999.

Ti-kang died of a cerebral haemorrhage on 29 December 2022, at the age of 94.

Catholic Church titles
Preceded by Matthew Kia Yen-wen	Archbishop of Taipei; 1989–2004	Succeeded by Joseph Cheng Tsai-fa
Preceded by Matthew Kia Yen-wen	Apostolic Administrator of Kinmen or Quemoy Islands and Matzu; 1989–2004	Succeeded by Joseph Cheng Tsai-fa
Preceded by Matthew Kia Yen-wen	Bishop of Chiayi; 1975–1985	Succeeded by Joseph Lin Tianzhu
