= Joseph Cheng Tsai-fa =

Taiwanese Roman Catholic prelate (1932–2022)

His Excellency Joseph Cheng Tsai-fa
- Archbishop Emeritus of Taipei
- Appointed: 24 January 2004
- Term ended: 9 November 2007
- Predecessor: Joseph Ti-kang
- Successor: John Hung Shan-chuan
- Other posts: Apostolic Administrator of Kinmen or Quemoy Islands and Matzu (2004–2007)
- Previous post: Bishop of Tainan (1990–2004)

Orders
- Ordination: 21 December 1957
- Consecration: 2 February 1991 by Paul Ch’eng Shih-kuang

Personal details
- Born: 4 July 1932 Xiamen, China
- Died: 2 September 2022 (aged 90) Tainan, Taiwan

Joseph Cheng Tsai-fa (4 July 1932 – 2 September 2022) was a Taiwanese Roman Catholic prelate.

Cheng was born in Xiamen, Fujian, and was ordained to the priesthood in 1957. He served as bishop of the Roman Catholic Diocese of Tainan, Taiwan from 1991 to 2004 and served as archbishop of the Roman Catholic Archdiocese of Taipei, Taiwan, from 2004 until 2007 when he retired.

Catholic Church titles
Preceded by Joseph Ti-kang	Archbishop of Taipei; 2004–2007	Succeeded by John Hung Shan-chuan
Preceded by Joseph Ti-kang	Apostolic Administrator of Kinmen or Quemoy Islands and Matzu; 2004–2007	Succeeded by John Hung Shan-chuan
Preceded by Paul Ch'eng Shih-kuang	Bishop of Tainan; 1990–2004	Succeeded by Bosco Lin Chi-nan
