= Taipei Prison =

Prison in Guishan, Taoyuan, Taiwan

Coordinates: 24.9950°N 121.3380°E

Taipei Prison 法務部矯正署臺北監獄
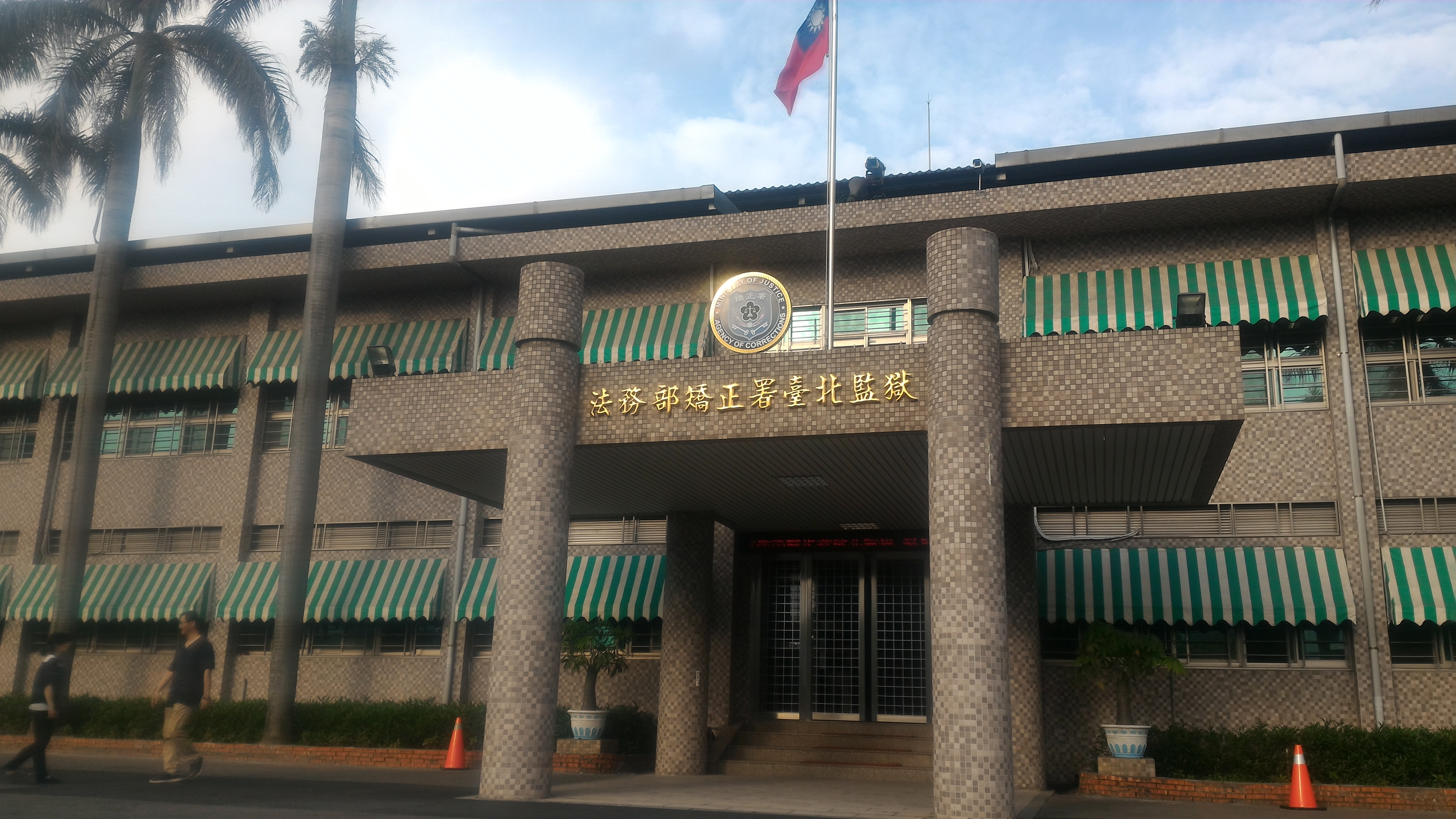
- Interactive map of Taipei Prison 法務部矯正署臺北監獄
- Location: Guishan, Taoyuan City, Taiwan
- Capacity: 2,705
- Opened: 1895
- Former name: Taihoku Penalty Institute
- Website: www.tpp.moj.gov.tw

The Taipei Prison, Agency of Corrections, Ministry of Justice (Chinese: 法務部矯正署臺北監獄; pinyin: Fǎwùbù Jiǎozhèngshǔ Táiběi Jiānyù, Nickname: 北監/北监 Běijiān) is a prison located in Guishan District, Taoyuan City, Taiwan, under the jurisdiction of the Ministry of Justice.

It can hold up to 2,705 prisoners. It houses criminals who have committed serious crimes and repeat criminals from northern Taiwan who are sentenced to at least ten years in prison. Taipei Prison also houses foreign prisoners. Three branch prisons of Taipei Prison, Taipei Detention Center, Shilin Detention Center, and Sindian Detention Center, hold prisoners with sentences of less than five years each.

== History ==
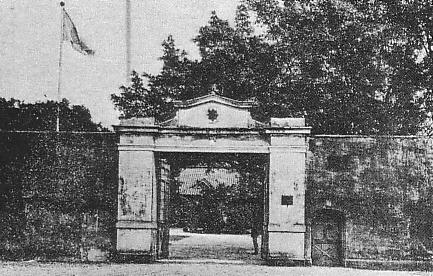
The historical Taihoku Prison

The prison was originally established in 1895 as the Taihoku Penalty Institute (臺北縣臺北監獄署). It was a remodeled facility built under the Qing Dynasty. It was rebuilt in an area southeast of Taihoku City (modern-day Taipei) in 1902; this is the current Ai Guo East Road. Allied POW's were held here during the war; on 19 June 1945 fourteen US Army and Navy airmen were executed at Taihoku Prison in the early morning. They were found guilty of "indiscriminate bombing" of civilians of Taiwan. Their remains were cremated and their ashes placed a local shrine. The prison received its current name, Taiwan Taipei Prison, in October 1945, as the Republic of China took control of Taiwan from Imperial Japan. As time passed, the prison became overcrowded as Taiwan was at war. The Ministry of Judicial Administration sold the previous site and bought 19.6422-hectare (48.537-acre) of land in Guishan so a new facility could begin construction at the end of 1958. On October 11, 1961 the groundbreaking occurred and was completed at the end of December 1962. On January 11, 1963, on Judicial Day, the prison opened in Guishan.

== Notable prisoners ==
- Chen Shui-bian, Taiwan's former president was incarcerated for 19 years at the Taipei Prison as Inmate 1020.
- Gary Wang, media tycoon, founder of Eastern Media was convicted in a prison-corruption case in 2019 and sentenced to 2 years and 2 months for bribing a prison official.
- Justin Lee, socialite and convicted rapist, serving a 39 years and 2 months sentence.
- Oren Shlomo Mayer, Israeli-American drug dealer, sentenced to life in 2021 for murdering and dismembering a Canadian expat.
- Alex Tsai, the former Kuomintang legislator was sentenced to 3 years and 6 months in prison for embezzlement. He began serving his sentence in March 2026, in Taipei Prison.
- Lucifer Chu, a media personality, served a 11-month prison sentence for indecent assault.

== See also ==
- Remains of Taipei prison walls
