= Andrew Tsien Chih-ch'un =

- Bishop of Hwalien
- Native name: 錢志純
- Church: Catholic Church
- Diocese: Diocese of Hwalien
- In office: 23 January 1992 – 19 November 2001
- Predecessor: Paul Shan Kuo-hsi
- Successor: Philip Huang Chao-ming

Orders
- Ordination: 29 June 1953
- Consecration: 11 April 1992 by Dominic Tang

Personal details
- Born: 9 April 1926 Republic of China
- Died: 17 February 2009 (aged 82)

Andrew Tsien Chih-ch'un (Chinese: 錢志純; pinyin: Qián Zhìchún; 9 April 1926 – 17 February 2009) was the third Catholic bishop of Hwalien. He was ordained a priest in Taipei in 1953. He was appointed bishop after Paul Shan Kuo-hsi was appointed bishop of Kaohsiung. He retired in 2001.

Catholic Church titles
Preceded by Paul Shan Kuo-hsi	Bishop of Hualien; 1992–2001	Succeeded by Philip Huang
