= Remains of Taipei Prison Wall =

Wall in Taipei, Taiwan

Coordinates: 25°1′58.02″N 121°31′36.59″E

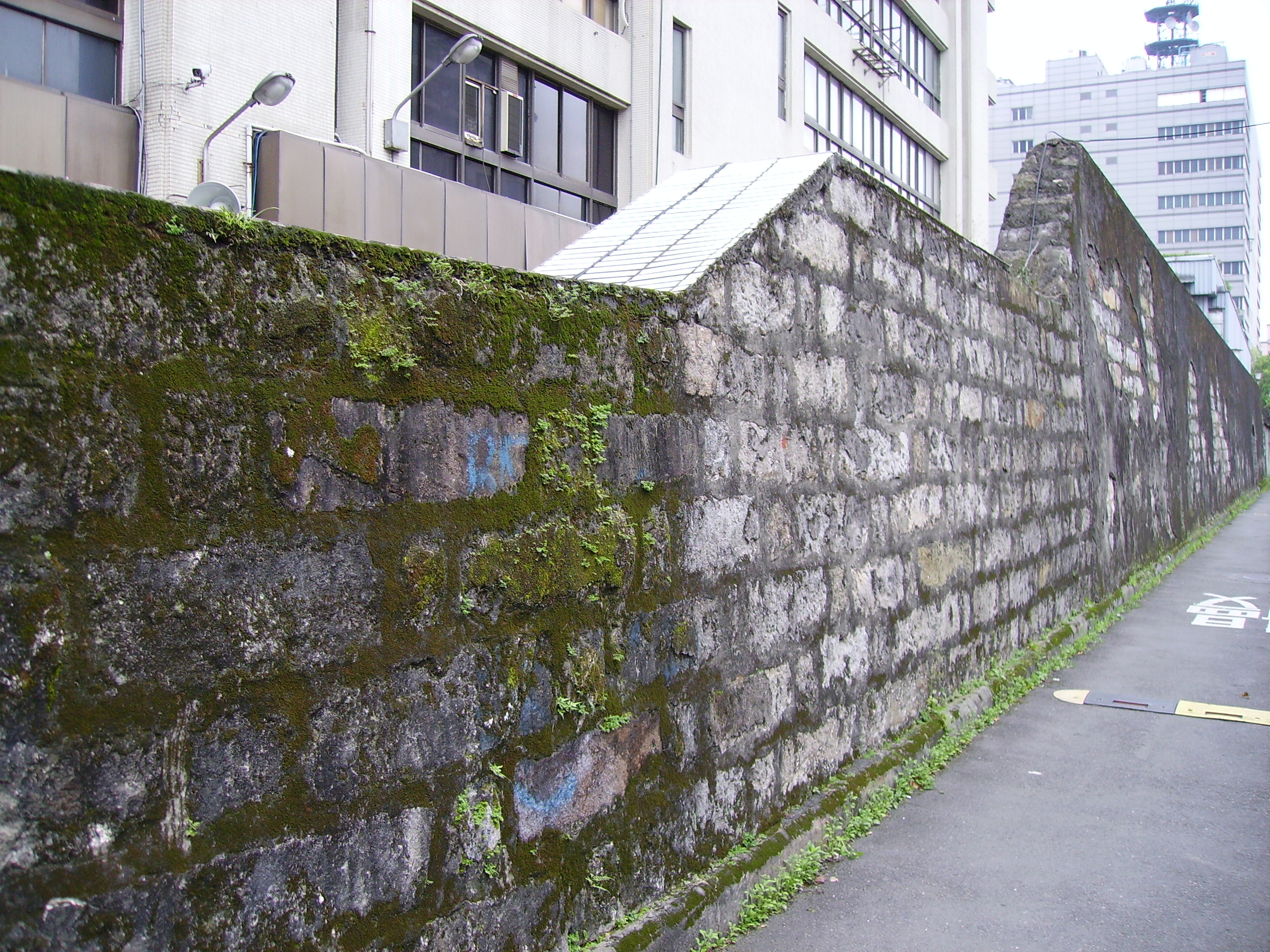
Remains of Taipei Prison Wall

The Remains of Taipei Prison Wall (Chinese: 臺北監獄圍牆遺蹟; pinyin: Táiběi Jiānyù Wéiqiáng Yíjī) are located in Zhongzheng District, Taipei, Taiwan, at the end of Aiguo East Road and Jinshan South Road next to the Southern Taipei operations center for Chunghwa Telecom. About 100 meters of wall exist on both sides of the Chunghwa Telecom property.

The walls were built during Japanese rule.

== Background ==
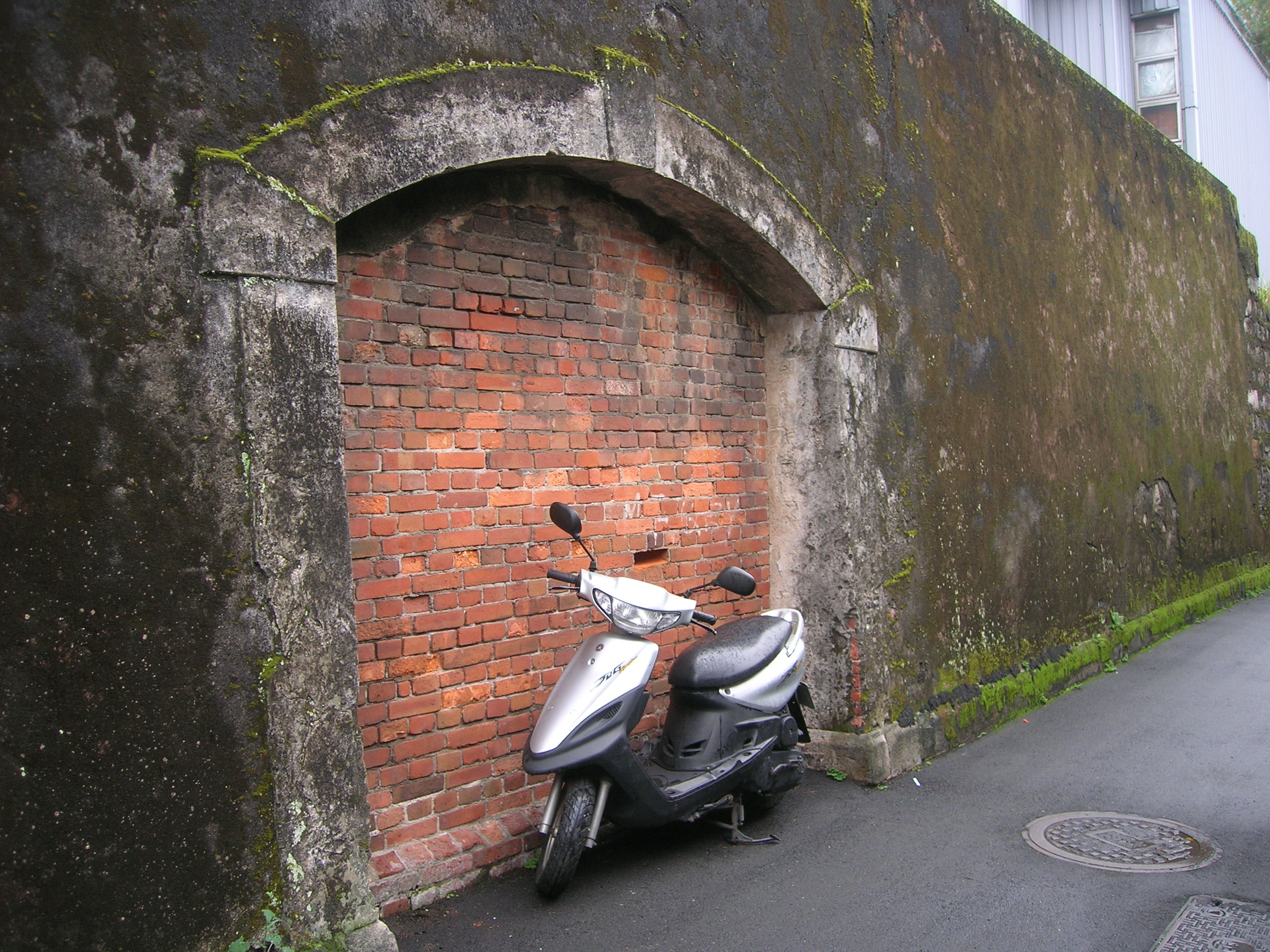
Remains of old Taipei Prison gate

In 1895, China ceded Taiwan to Japan after the First Sino-Japanese War. Taiwan thus became Japan's first colony. Many Taiwanese resisted, and anti-Japanese uprisings became common.

In response, the Japanese colonial government built large prisons in Taihoku and Tainan Prefecture to hold political prisoners.

The Taipei prison was based on a radial floor plan, a standard prison design of the 19th century. The prison walls were made with stones from the Old Taipei City Wall, built by the Qing Dynasty at the end of the 19th century. The hand-cut stones came from the quartzose sandstone quarries in the Dazhi (大直) and Neihu areas of Taipei.

== World War II Allied prisoners ==
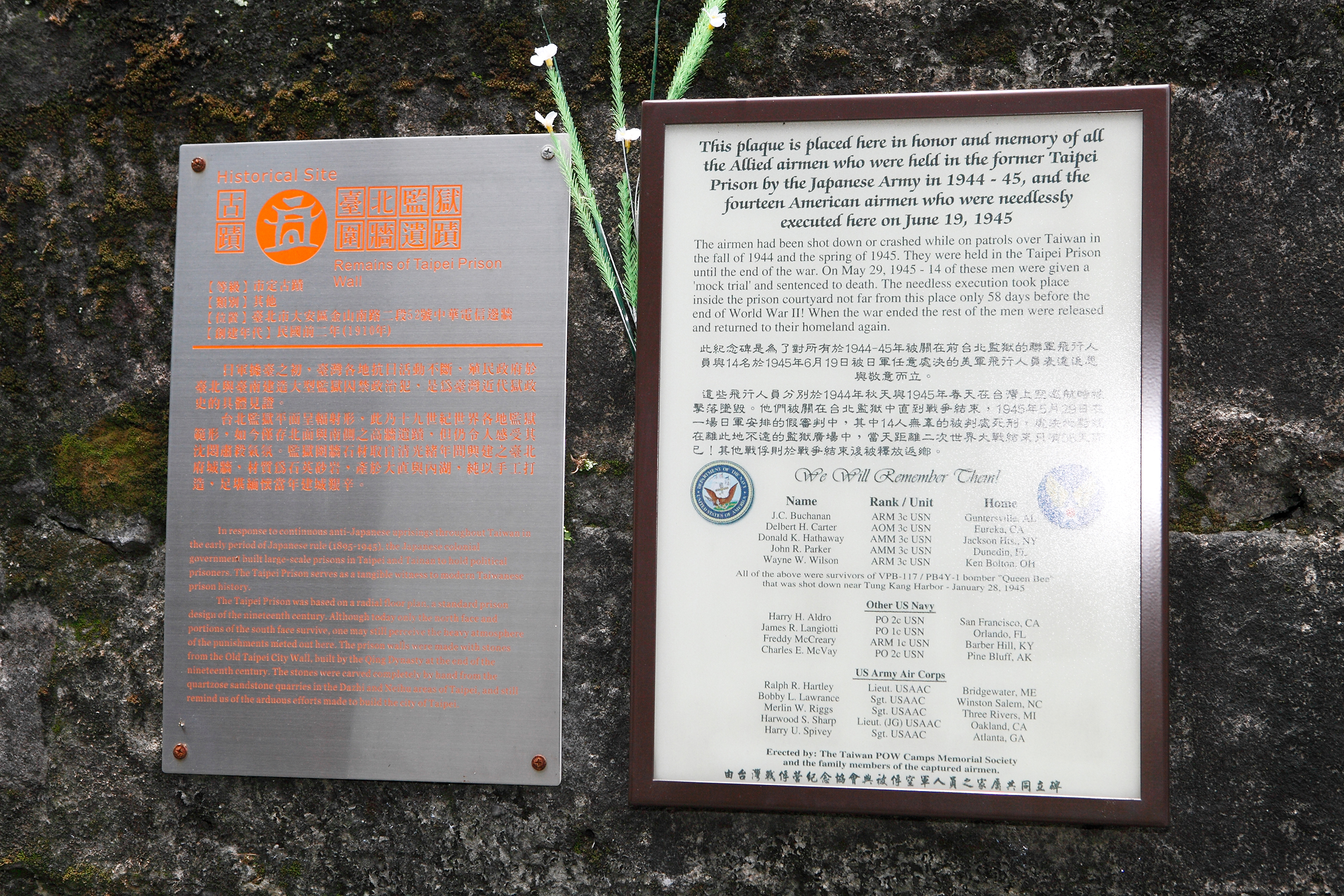
Plaques on the remains of Taipei's prison wall, one listing Allied airmen executed in the prison in 1945

In 1944 and 1945, Allied airmen who had been shot down or crashed while on patrols over Taiwan were held in the Taipei Prison by the Japanese Army. On 29 May 1945, 14 of these allied airmen were given a mock trial and sentenced to death. They were executed in the prison courtyard 58 days before the end of World War II. When the war ended, the rest of the men were released and returned home.

Name	Rank/Unit	Home
J.C. Buchanan	ARM 3c USN	Guntersville, Alabama
Delbert H. Carter	AOM 3c USN	Eureka, California
Donald K. Hathaway	AMM 3c USN	Jackson Heights, New York
John R. Parker	AMM 3c USN	Dunedin, Florida
Wayne W. Wilson	ARM 3c USN	
Harry H. Aldro	PO 2c USN	San Francisco, California
James R. Langiotti	PO 1c USN	Orlando, Florida
Freddy McCreary	ARM 1c USN	Barber Hill, Kentucky
Charles E. McVay	PO 2c USN	Pine Bluff, Arkansas
Ralph R. Hartley	Lieutenant USAAC	Bridgewater, Maine
Bobby L. Lawrance	Sgt USAAC	Winston-Salem, North Carolina
Merlin W. Riggs	Sgt USAAC	Three Rivers, Michigan
Harwood S. Sharp	Lieutenant (JG) USAAC	Oakland, California
Harry U. Spivey	Sgt USAAC	Atlanta, Georgia

== See also ==
- Taipei Prison
- Aerial Battle of Taiwan-Okinawa
- Taiwan under Japanese rule
- Raid on Taipei
