= John Hung Shan-chuan =

His Excellency, The Most Reverend John Hung Shan-Chuan SVD
- Archbishop Emeritus of Taipei
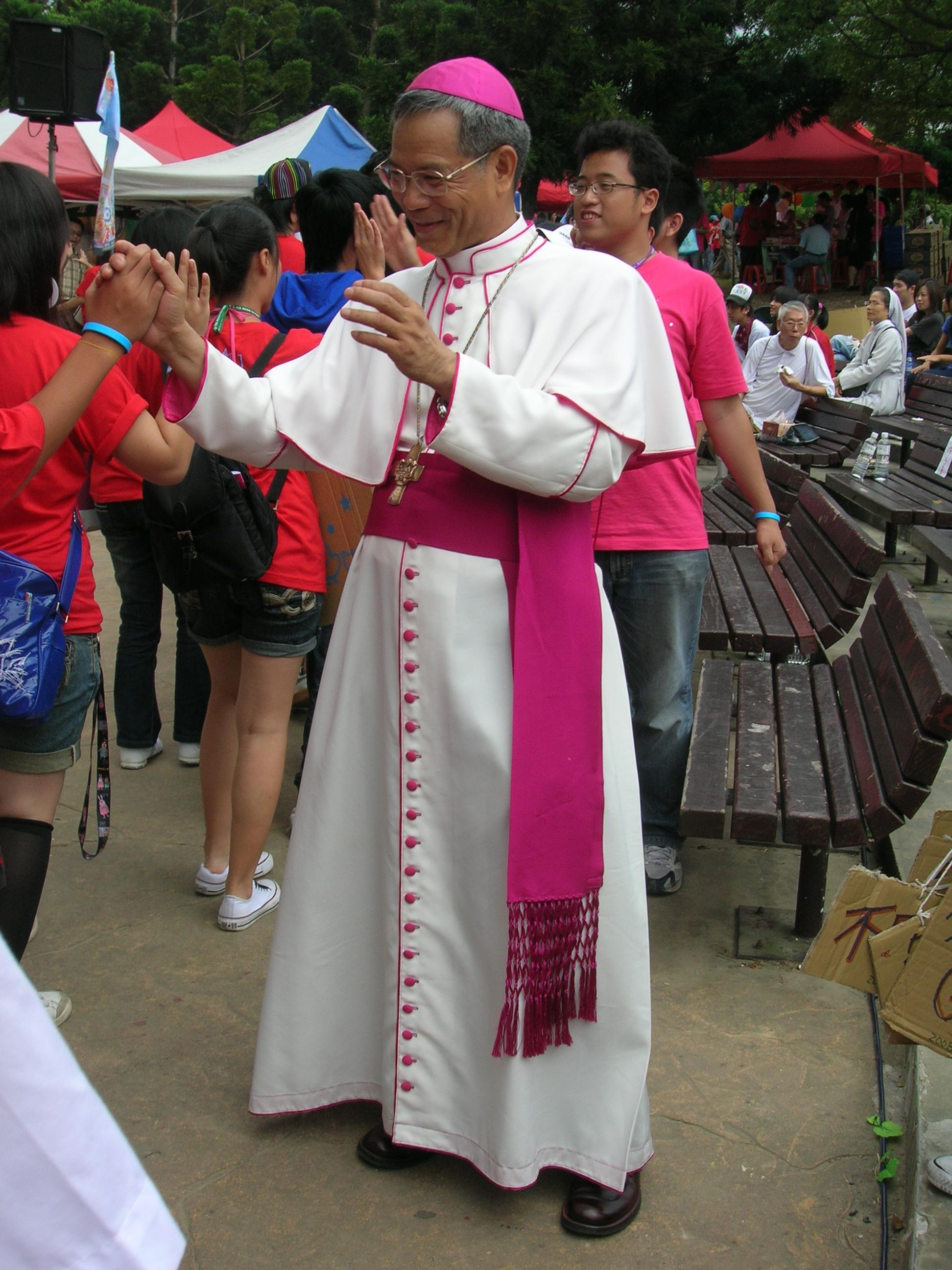
- Archdiocese: Taipei
- Appointed: November 9, 2007
- Installed: September 8, 2011
- Term ended: May 23, 2020
- Predecessor: Joseph Cheng Tsai-fa
- Successor: Thomas Chung An-Zu
- Previous post: Bishop of Kiayi (2006-2007)

Orders
- Ordination: June 23, 1973 by Cyril John Vogel

Personal details
- Born: November 20, 1943 (age 82) Hōko Prefecture, Japanese Taiwan
- Denomination: Roman Catholic

John Hung Shan-chuan S.V.D. (born November 20, 1943) was the archbishop of the Roman Catholic Archdiocese of Taipei. He was first appointed to the post in November 2007, having previously served as the bishop of the Diocese of Kiayi. His episcopal resignation was accepted by Pope Francis on May 23, 2020, and his care of diocese was immediately succeeded by Archbishop Thomas Chung An-Zu.
