= Raid on Taipei =

Large-scale air raids on Taipei during World War II

Taihoku Air Raid
- Part of World War II, Pacific theater
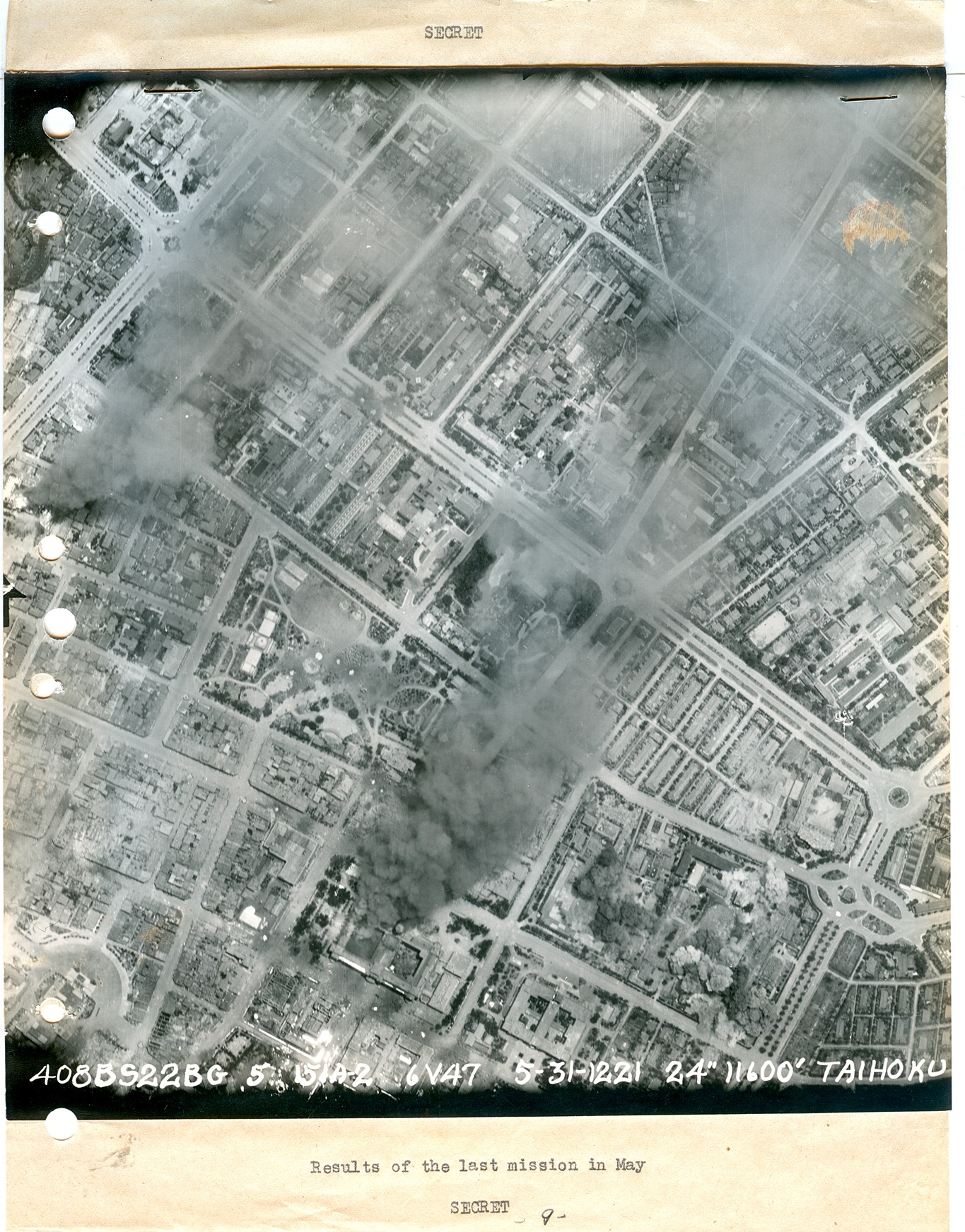
- An aerial photograph by U.S. Air Force
Date	May 31, 1945
Location	Taihoku, Japanese Taiwan (modern-day Taipei, Taiwan)
Result	Allied victory

Belligerents
Japan	United States

Strength
Virtually nonexistent	117 B-24

Casualties and losses
Unknown	None
- 3,000+ civilians killed and tens of thousands wounded or displaced

The Taihoku Air Raid (Note: Chinese: 臺北大空襲; pinyin: Táiběi Dà Kōngxí; Japanese: 台北大空襲; rōmaji: Taihoku Daikūshū) or Operation Wildfire named by British India, was the largest Allied air raid on the city of Taihoku (modern-day Taipei), then capital of Japanese-ruled Taiwan, during World War II. Many residents were killed in the raid and tens of thousands wounded or displaced.

== Background ==
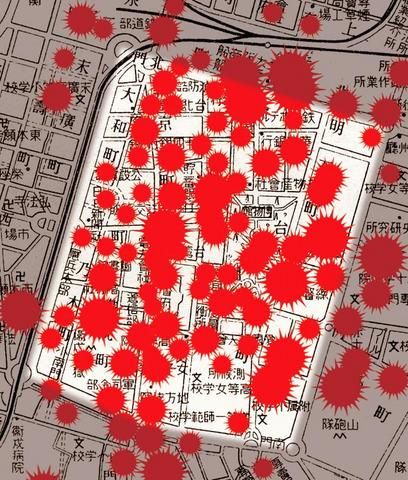
Location of bombs landed during the air raid

As early as 1943, Fourteenth Air Force of the United States Army Air Forces and units of the combined air force of U.S., Nationalist China had launched several air raids against military and industrial targets in Japanese Taiwan. Before this, Soviet volunteer units and combined Chinese and Indian air force had attacked military bases around Taihoku, most of which were targeted on smaller objectives and were of smaller scales. After American ground forces captured Subic Bay in the Philippines, the Allied air forces began larger and more systematic air raids against targets on the island of Taiwan. After 12 October 1944, Allied air forces began scheduled air raids on factories located in Heitō, Kobi, and Port of Takao, and fighter production facility in the outskirt of Takao. Also, Taihoku, the capital and political and financial center of Taiwan, had been under constant aerial assaults by the Allies since that time.

== Air raid ==
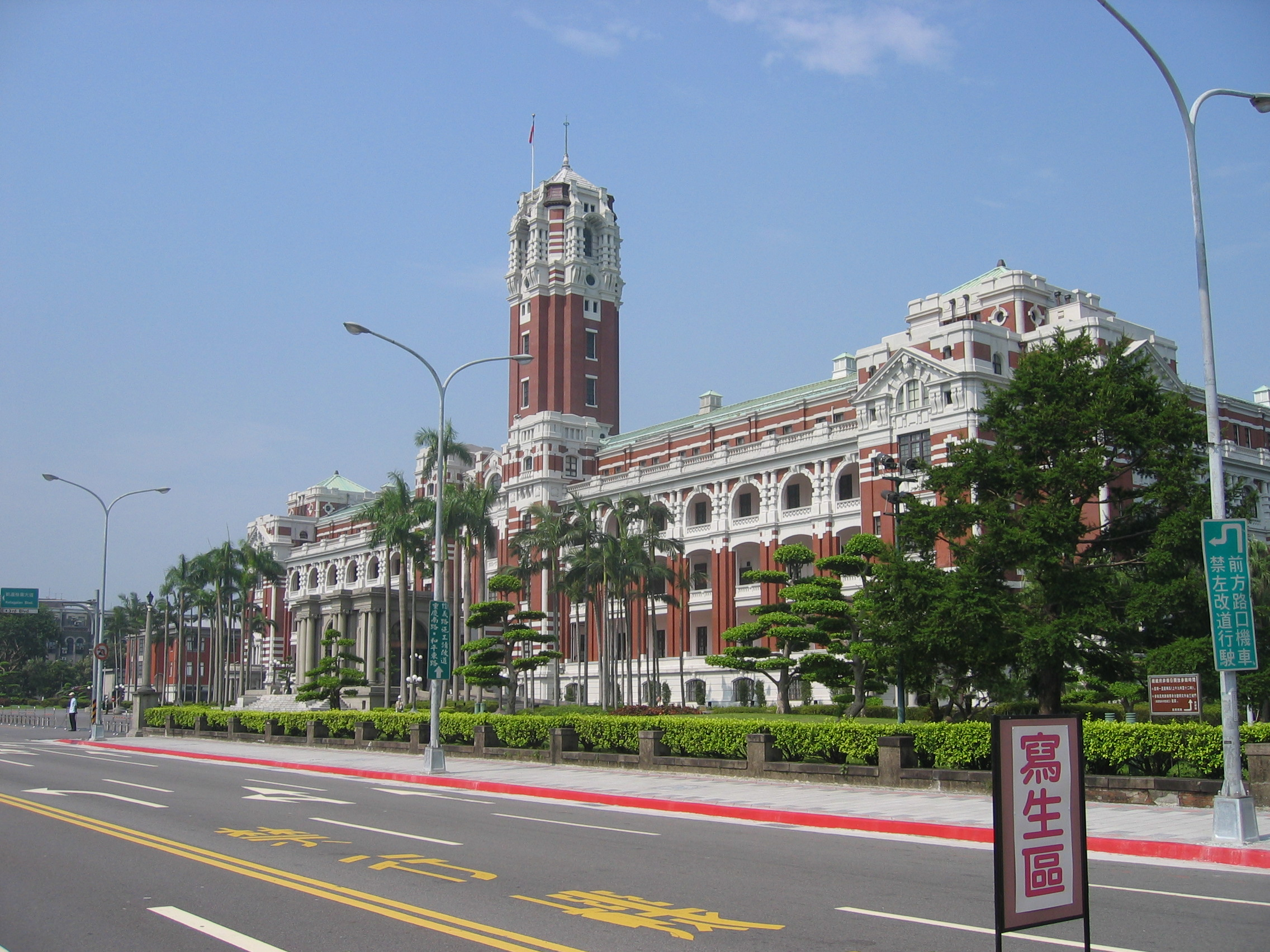
The Japanese Governor-General's Office (now the Presidential Office Building) was directly hit

On 31 May 1945, units of the Fifth Air Force consisting of 117 Consolidated B-24 Liberator heavy bombers were sent to conduct the largest air raid ever on Taiwan. The bombing began from around ten o'clock in the morning and lasted until one o'clock in the afternoon, during which the attack was non-stop. The Americans met virtually no resistance from the Japanese, mainly due to the attrition the Japanese air forces had suffered in the Aerial Battle of Taiwan-Okinawa, which completely exhausted Japan's fighter units in Taiwan. The Allies dropped approximately 3,800 bombs on military units and governmental facilities in Taihoku; many other buildings within the downtown area and Japanese quarter also suffered various damages.

=== Buildings hit ===
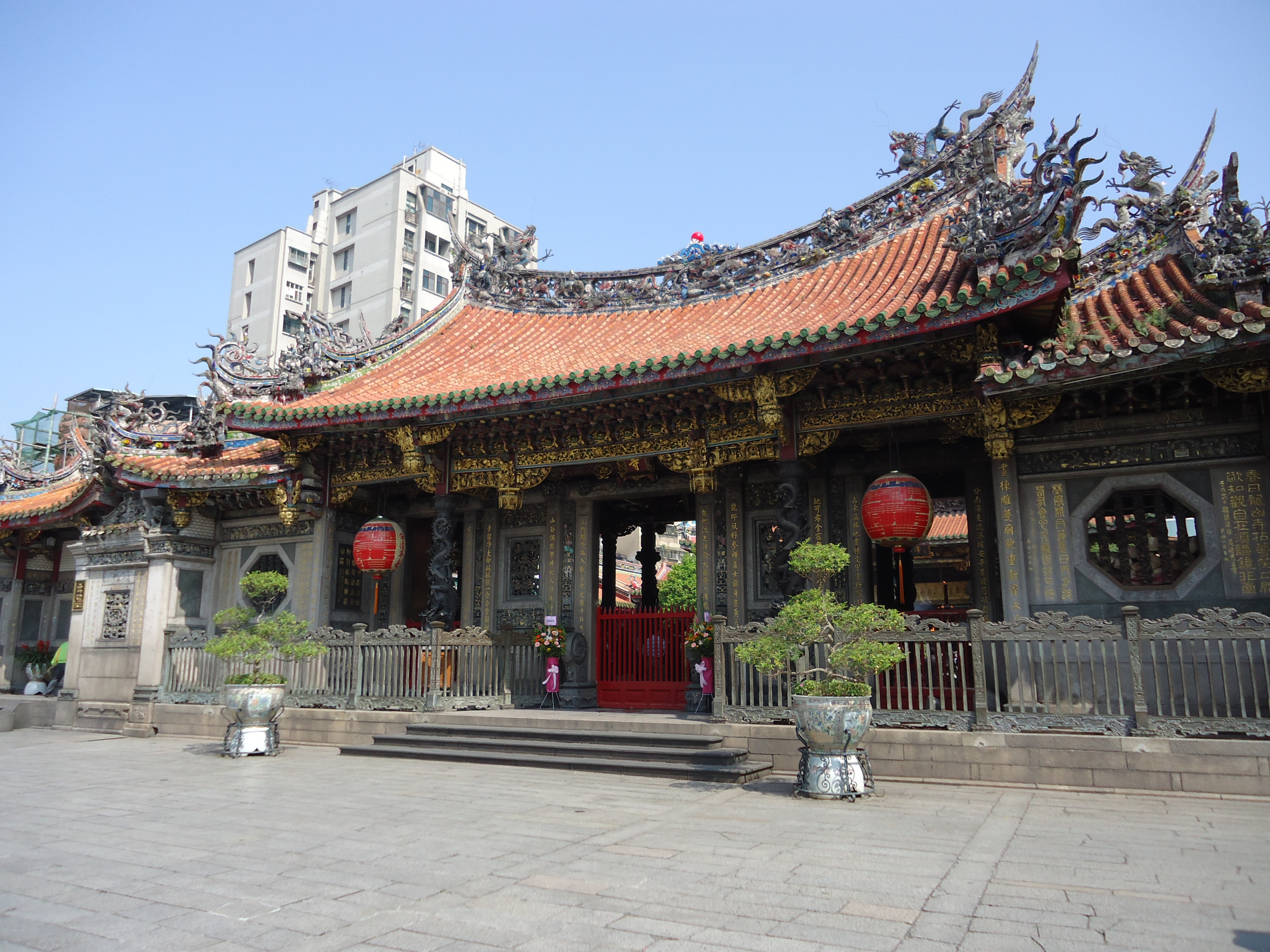
Lungshan Temple was extensively damaged by the raid and ensuing fire

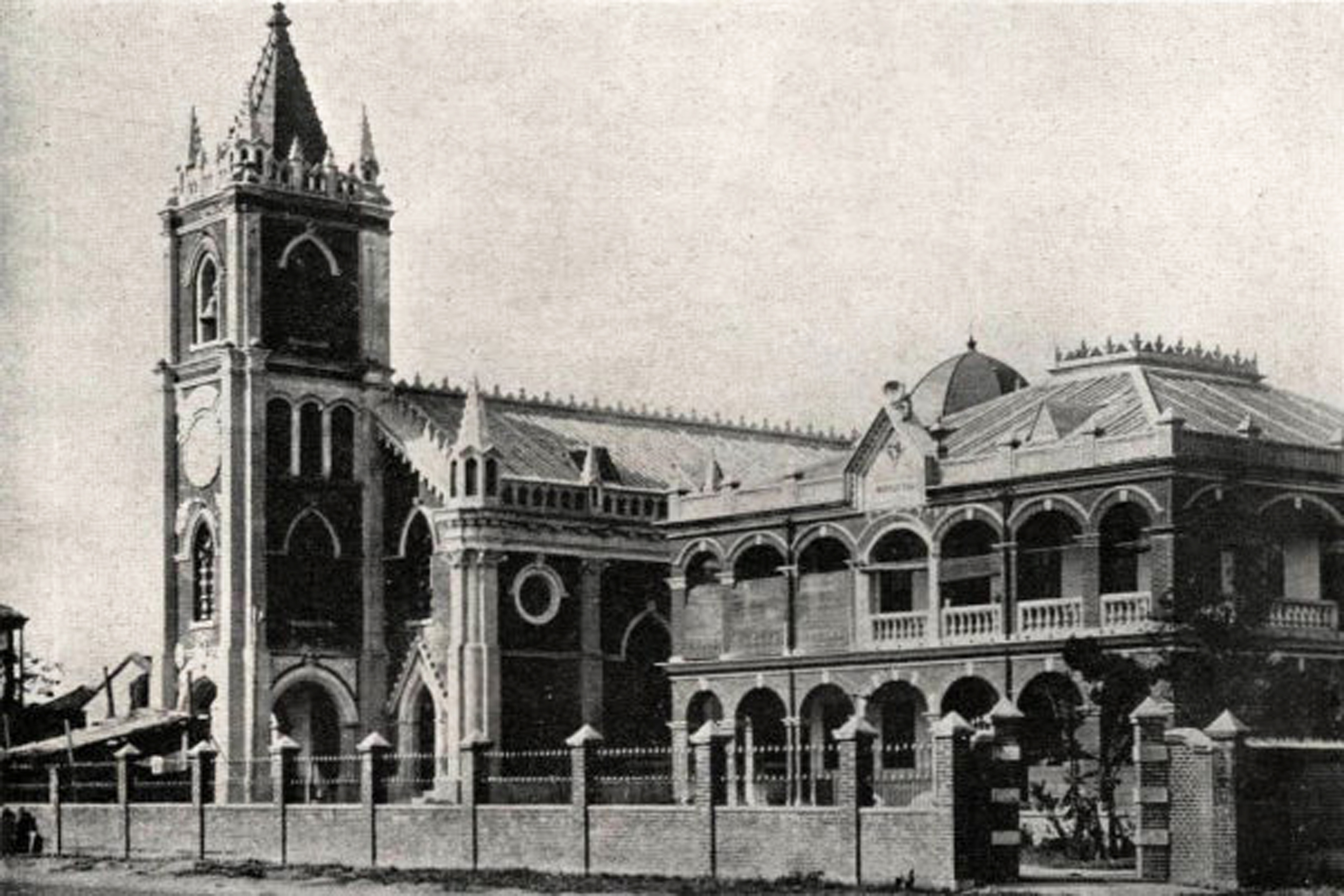
Immaculate Conception Cathedral was destroyed by air raid bombing

The Office of the Governor-General of Taiwan suffered a direct hit, in spite of the building being heavily camouflaged to avoid being targeted. The building suffered extensive damage from fire caused by the bombs and almost collapsed on itself; it was rendered unoccupiable and was not repaired until the Nationalist Chinese takeover. Other facilities hit during the bombing included the residence of the Assistant Governor-General, Taiwan Railway Hotel, Office of Governor-General Library, Army Headquarters, Taihoku Imperial University, Taihoku Station, Bank of Taiwan, Taihoku High Court, Taihoku New Park, and many other facilities.

=== Civilian casualties ===
Many civilian installations were damaged, including Taihoku Prefectural Taihoku First Girls' High School, Huashan Catholic Church of Taihoku, and the famous Lungshan Temple of Manka, which was hit in the main building and the left corridor; many precious artifacts and art works in the temple were lost in the ensuing fire.

== Aftermath ==
The number of deaths totaled more than 3,000, which exceeded the total number of deaths resulting from all the previous air raids on Taiwan by the Allies. Tens of thousands of people were displaced or became homeless, and many buildings were destroyed either by the attacks or by the fire caused by the attacks. The air raid showed that the city was defenseless against Allied aerial assaults, and the Governor-General ordered schools and other installations to be evacuated, and that more air raid drills be held.

On 15 July 2009, two duds assumed to be dropped during this raid were found in a construction site of MRT Xinyi Line near Chiang Kai-shek Memorial Hall. Bomb-disposal units of the ROC Armed Forces removed them.

== See also ==
- Air raids on Japan
- Evacuations of civilians in Japan during World War II
- Fire-bombing of Tokyo
- Formosa Air Battle
- Remains of Taipei prison walls
- Strategic bombing during World War II
- Taihoku Airstrike
