= Taihoku Airstrike =

The Taihoku Airstrike (Chinese: 松山空襲) was an air raid conducted by the Soviet Volunteer Group with support from the military of the Republic of China against the metropolitan perimeter of Taihoku (modern-day Taipei), the capital of Japanese Taiwan, on 8 February 1938. The raid was the first attack on Imperial Japanese territory during the course of World War II, and one of the few early offensive operations conducted by the Soviet Union and China directly against Japan during the course of the war.

== Operation ==
The Taihoku Air Strike Operation was conducted by the members of the Soviet Volunteer Group who planned and implemented the strategic strike, with support from the Republic of China Air Force. As Soviet Union was not in a state of war with Japan, the Soviet volunteers used a squadron of nine Martin 139 bombers bearing the ROC emblem as disguise. The aircraft were deployed from airfields in Zhejiang and Fujian, and flew uncontested over the Taiwan Strait. Once over metropolitan Taihoku, the aircraft dropped leaflets, or according to some sources made a minor bombing strike, and successfully returned to China, under Japanese antiaircraft fire. Contemporary newspaper accounts stated that eight people were killed and 25 were wounded.

While achieving little militarily, this represented the first instance of an air raid over Japanese territory, preceding the Doolittle Raid against Tokyo by four years.

One foreign eyewitness, American diplomat George H. Kerr, described the air raid to the foreign press, and mentioned that as a result, sand barricades were built around important government and commerce buildings, anti-aircraft guns were deployed, and internal security strengthened against possible fifth column activity by the local ethnic Chinese population.

== See also ==
- Development of Chinese Nationalist air force (1937–45)
- Formosa Air Battle
- Raid on Taipei
