= Paul Ch'eng Shih-kuang =

Taiwanese prelate

- Bishop of Diocese of Tainan
- Church: Roman Catholic Church
- See: Diocese of Tainan
- In office: 1966 - 1990
- Predecessor: Clément Sirgue
- Successor: Joseph Marie Régis Belzile
- Previous post: Auxiliary Bishop of Taipei (1960-1966)

Orders
- Ordination: June 29, 1943
- Consecration: July 25, 1960 by Thomas Tien Ken-hsin

Personal details
- Born: September 15, 1915 Hsiao-yi, Shanxi
- Died: August 23, 2012 (aged 96) Situn District, Taichung City

Paul Ch'eng Shih-kuang (Chinese: 成世光; pinyin: Chéng Shìguāng; 15 September 1915 – 23 August 2012) was a Taiwanese prelate of the Roman Catholic Church.

Shih-kuang was born in Hsiao-Yi, Taiwan in the fall of 1915 and was ordained a priest 29 June 1943. Shih-kuang was appointed an Auxiliary Bishop for the Taipei Archdiocese on 3 May 1960 as well as Titular Bishop of Uccula and ordained bishop on 25 July 1960. He was appointed bishop of Diocese of Tainan on 7 June 1966 and remained in the position until his retirement 3 December 1990.
