= John Baptist Huang Min-Cheng =

Taiwanese bishop

Most Reverend John Baptist Huang Min-Cheng, OFM.
- Bishop of Tainan
- Native name: 施洗約翰黃敏正
- Church: Catholic Church; Latin Church
- Diocese: Tainan
- Appointed: 3 May 2023
- Predecessor: Bosco Lin Chi-nan
- Successor: Incumbent

Orders
- Ordination: 29 March 1984
- Consecration: 24 June 2023 by Bosco Lin Chi-nan

Personal details
- Born: John Baptist Huang Min-Cheng; 23 March 1955 (age 71) Madou, Tainan, Taiwan
- Education: Pontifical Athenaeum Antonianum
- Motto: AD VOLUNTATEM DOMINI / 主旨承行
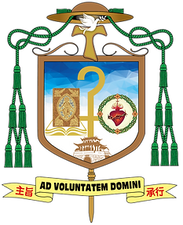
- Coat of arms

John Baptist Huang Min-Chen OFM is a Taiwanese Roman Catholic prelate currently serving as the bishop of the Roman Catholic Diocese of Tainan, Taiwan.

== Early life and education ==
Min-Cheng was born on 23 March 1955, in Madou, Tainan, Taiwan. He attended the Franciscan minor seminary in Neihu district and studied philosophy and theology in Taipei. He was awarded a master's degree in spirituality from the Pontifical University Antonianum in Rome.

== Priesthood ==
Bishop Min-Cheng was ordained a priest on 29 March 1984, in Tainan for the Franciscan Order of Friars Minor.

== Episcopate ==
On 3 May 2023, Pope Francis appointed Min-Cheng as the bishop of the Roman Catholic Diocese of Tainan. He was ordained a bishop on 24 June 2023 by Bosco Lin Chi-nan.

== See also ==
- Catholic Church in Taiwan
