= Matthew Kia Yen-wen =

Taiwanese Roman Catholic prelate

- Archbishop of Taipei
- Native name: 賈彥文
- Church: Catholic Church
- Archdiocese: Archdiocese of Taipei
- In office: 15 November 1978 – 11 February 1989
- Predecessor: Stanislaus Lo Kuang
- Successor: Joseph Ti Kang
- Other posts: Apostolic Administrator of the Kinmen (or Quemoy) and Matsu Islands (1981-1989)
- Previous posts: Bishop of Hualien (1974-1978); Bishop of Chiayi (1970-1974)

Orders
- Ordination: 15 July 1951
- Consecration: 16 July 1970 by Paul Yu Pin

Personal details
- Born: 17 January 1925 Yuen-shi Hsiang, Hopeh, Republic of China
- Died: 22 August 2017 (aged 92) Hualien City, Hualien County, Republic of China

Coat of arms of Matthew Kia Yen Wen

Coat of arms of Matthew Kia Yen Wen

Matthew Kia Yen-wen (Chinese: 賈彥文; pinyin: Jiǎ Yànwén; 17 January 1925 – 22 August 2017) was a bishop of Hualien and Chiayi, an archbishop of Taipei, and the Archbishop Emeritus of Taipei until his death in 2017.

Kia was ordained priest on 15 July 1951 in Tainan, Taiwan. He was appointed the first Bishop of Chiayi on 21 May 1970 and installed on 16 July 1970. He was appointed Bishop of Hualien on 14 December 1974. He became the Archbishop of Taipei on 18 November 1978. He resigned on 11 February 1989.

Preceded by diocese created	Bishop of Chiayi; 1970–1974	Succeeded by Joseph Ti-kang
Preceded by diocese created	Bishop of Hualien; 1974–1978	Succeeded by Paul Shan Kuo-hsi
Preceded by Stanislaus Lokuang	Archbishop of Taipei; 1978–1989	Succeeded by Joseph Ti-kang
