= Holy Rosary Cathedral, Kaohsiung =

Church in Lingya, Kaohsiung, Taiwan

The Basilica Cathedral of Our Lady of the Most Holy Rosary
- 玫瑰聖母聖殿主教座堂
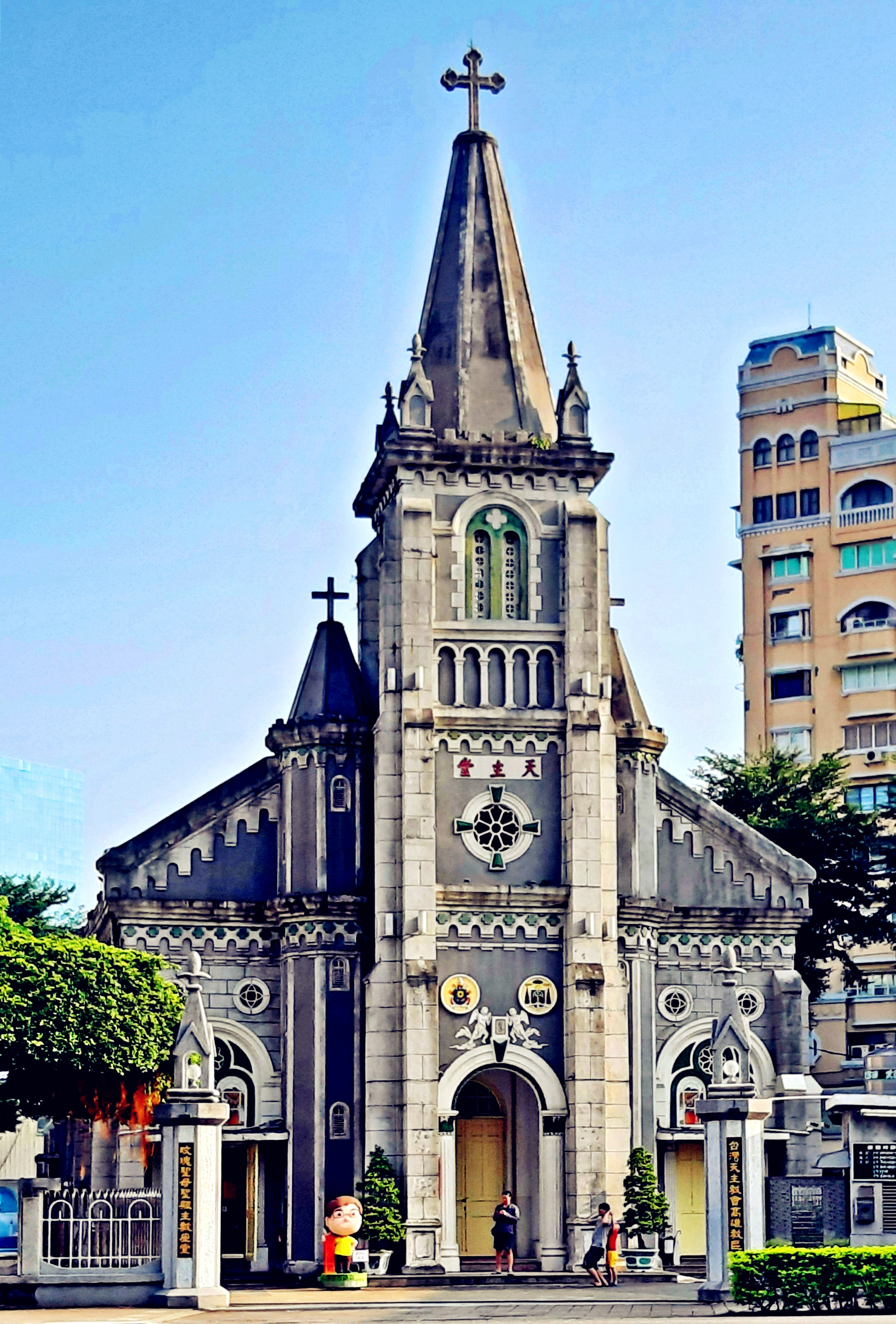
- Front Facade of the Minor Basilica
- The Basilica Cathedral of Our Lady of the Most Holy Rosary
- 22.62022°N 120.29165°E
- Location: Lingya, Kaohsiung, Taiwan
- Country: Republic of China
- Denomination: Roman Catholic
- Website: https://www.facebook.com/cathedralminorbasiliica?mibextid=ZbWKwL

Architecture
- Architectural type: Neo-Gothic
- Groundbreaking: 1860
- Completed: 1928; 98 years ago

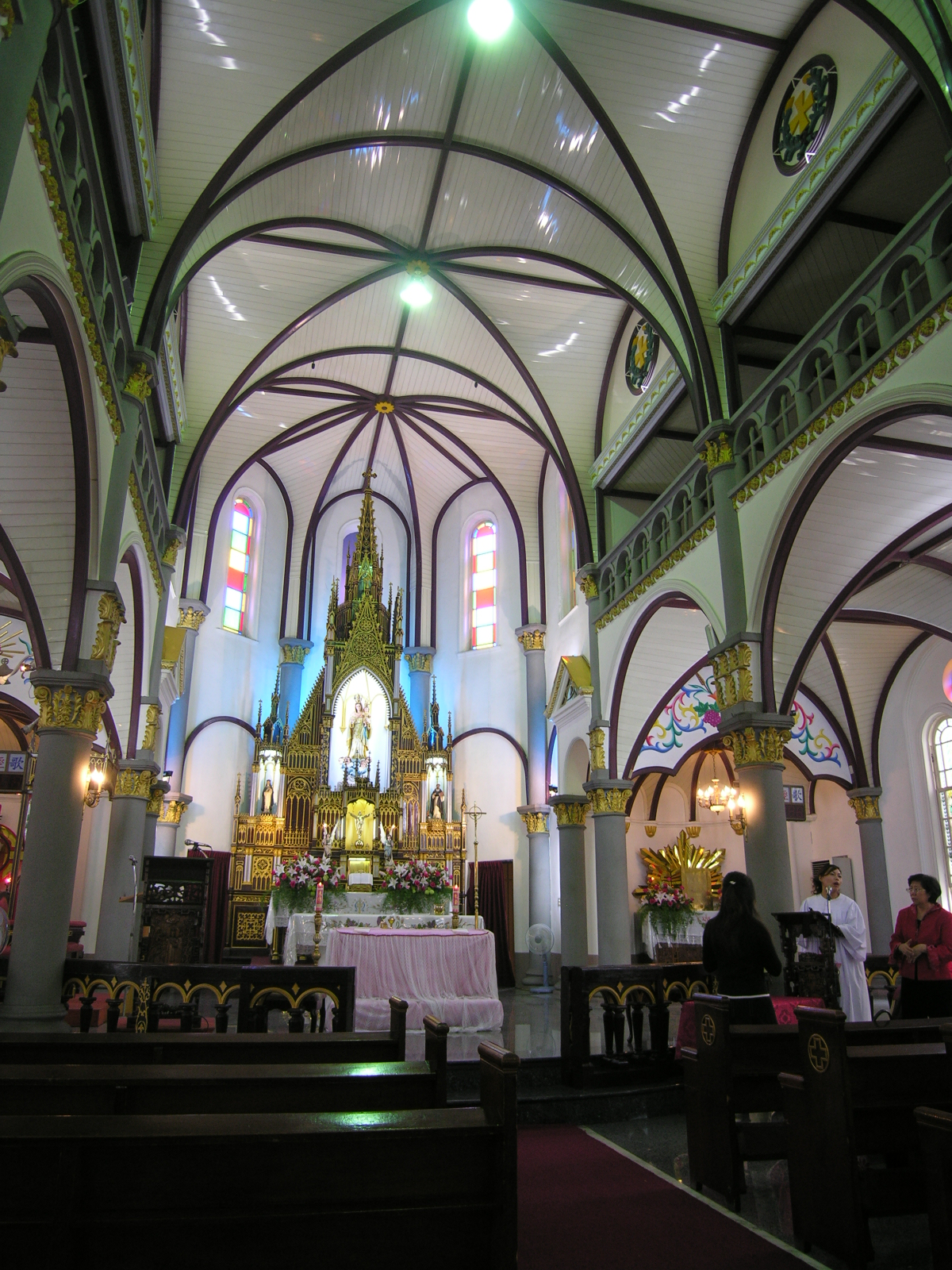
Interior of the main altar.

The Basilica Cathedral of Our Lady of the Holy Rosary (Chinese: 前金天主堂; pinyin: qiánjīn tiānzhǔ táng; Pe̍h-ōe-jī: cheng-kim thian-chu tong; officially called Chinese: 玫瑰聖母聖殿主教座堂) is the oldest Roman Catholic church and Minor Basilica in the Republic of China. The shrine is dedicated to the Blessed Virgin Mary under the venerated title of Our Lady of the Holy Rosary. It is located in Lingya District, Kaohsiung and is the seat of the Bishop of Kaohsiung.

Pope John Paul II raised the shrine to the status of Minor Basilica via his Pontifical decree Deipara in Cælis on 22 May 1995. (Note: Ioannem Paulum Secundum, Papam. Prænotanda Numerorum #370–713. Signed by the Dean of the College of Cardinals, Angelorus Sodanum. Vatican Secret Archives.) The decree was signed and notarized by the former Vatican Secretary of State, Cardinal Angelo Sodano.

== History ==
The original cathedral was first established in 1858 to 1860 by the Kingdom of Spain based in the Philippines. It was started by Spaniard Catholic priests, Father Fernando Sainz of the Dominican Order and Father Angelo Bofurull. It was rebuilt to its present dimensions in 1928.

An image of the Madonna and Child of the Holy Rosary dates back from 1863 and is enshrined within the high altar of the basilica.

== Roman architecture ==
The architectural style is modeled after both Gothic and Romanesque. The interior design is loosely similar to that of Manila Cathedral in the Philippines.

== Religious services ==
At this shrine, Catholic Mass is offered daily. Due to its nearby vicinity to the Love River, it is also a popular tourist site for romantic lovers and families. The cathedral is mostly known throughout Kaohsiung for its annual Christmas Eve celebrations, which lasts the whole evening before Christmas Day.

== Transportation ==
The cathedral is accessible within walking distance west from Central Park Station of Kaohsiung MRT.

== See also ==
- Catholic Church in Taiwan
- Christianity in Taiwan
- Roman Catholic Diocese of Kaohsiung
