= Diocese of Tainan =

Roman Catholic diocese in Taiwan

Coordinates: 22.9873°N 120.2091°E

Diocese of Tainan Dioecesis Tainanensis 天主教台南教區

Location
- Country: Taiwan
- Territory: Tainan and Penghu
- Ecclesiastical province: Taipei
- Deaneries: 4

Statistics
- Area: 2,870 km^{2} (1,110 sq mi)
- Population: Total; Catholics: (as of 2015); 1,997,000; 8,274 (0.4%)
- Parishes: 32
- Members: 5,948

Information
- Denomination: Roman Catholic
- Sui iuris church: Latin Church
- Rite: Roman Rite
- Established: 21 March 1961
- Cathedral: Cathedral of Our Lady of China in Tainan
- Patron saint: Our Lady of China
- Secular priests: 8

Current leadership
- Pope: Leo XIV
- Bishop: John Baptist Huang Min-Cheng
- Metropolitan Archbishop: Thomas Chung An-zu
- Vicar General: Rev. John Lai Hsiao-chung
- Bishops emeritus: Bosco Lin Chi-nan; John Lee Juo-wang

Map
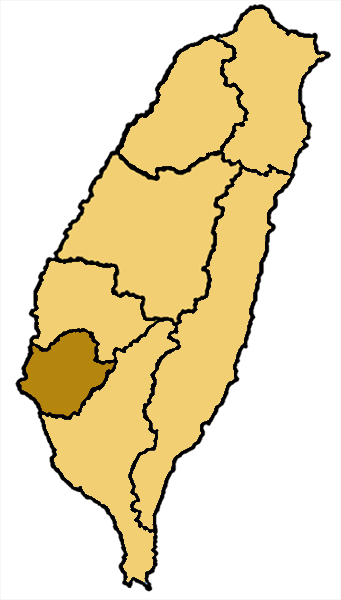

Website
- Website of the Diocese

The Diocese of Tainan (Latin: Dioecesis Tainanensis) is a Latin Church diocese of the Catholic Church in Taiwan.

Erected in March 1961 from territories belonging to the former Apostolic Prefecture of Kiayi, the diocese is a suffragan of the Archdiocese of Taipei.

== Ordinaries ==
- Stanislaus Lo Kuang (21 March 1961 Appointed – 15 February 1966 Appointed, Archbishop of Taipei)
- Paul Ch'eng Shih-kuang (7 June 1966 Appointed – 3 December 1990 Retired)
- Joseph Cheng Tsai-fa (3 December 1990 Appointed – 24 January 2004 Appointed, Archbishop of Taipei)
- Bosco Lin Chi-nan (24 January 2004 Appointed – 14 November 2020 Retired)
- John Lee Juo-wang (14 November 2020 Appointed – 19 June 2021 Resigned)
  - Bosco Lin Chi-nan (Apostolic Administrator) (19 June 2021 Appointed)
- John Baptist Huang Min-Cheng, O.F.M. (3 May 2023 Appointed)

== See also ==
- Catholic Church in Taiwan
