= Immaculate Conception Cathedral, Taipei =

Church in Datong, Taipei, Taiwan

Coordinates: 25°3′26.1″N 121°30′53.9″E

Immaculate Conception Cathedral
- 聖母無原罪主教座堂
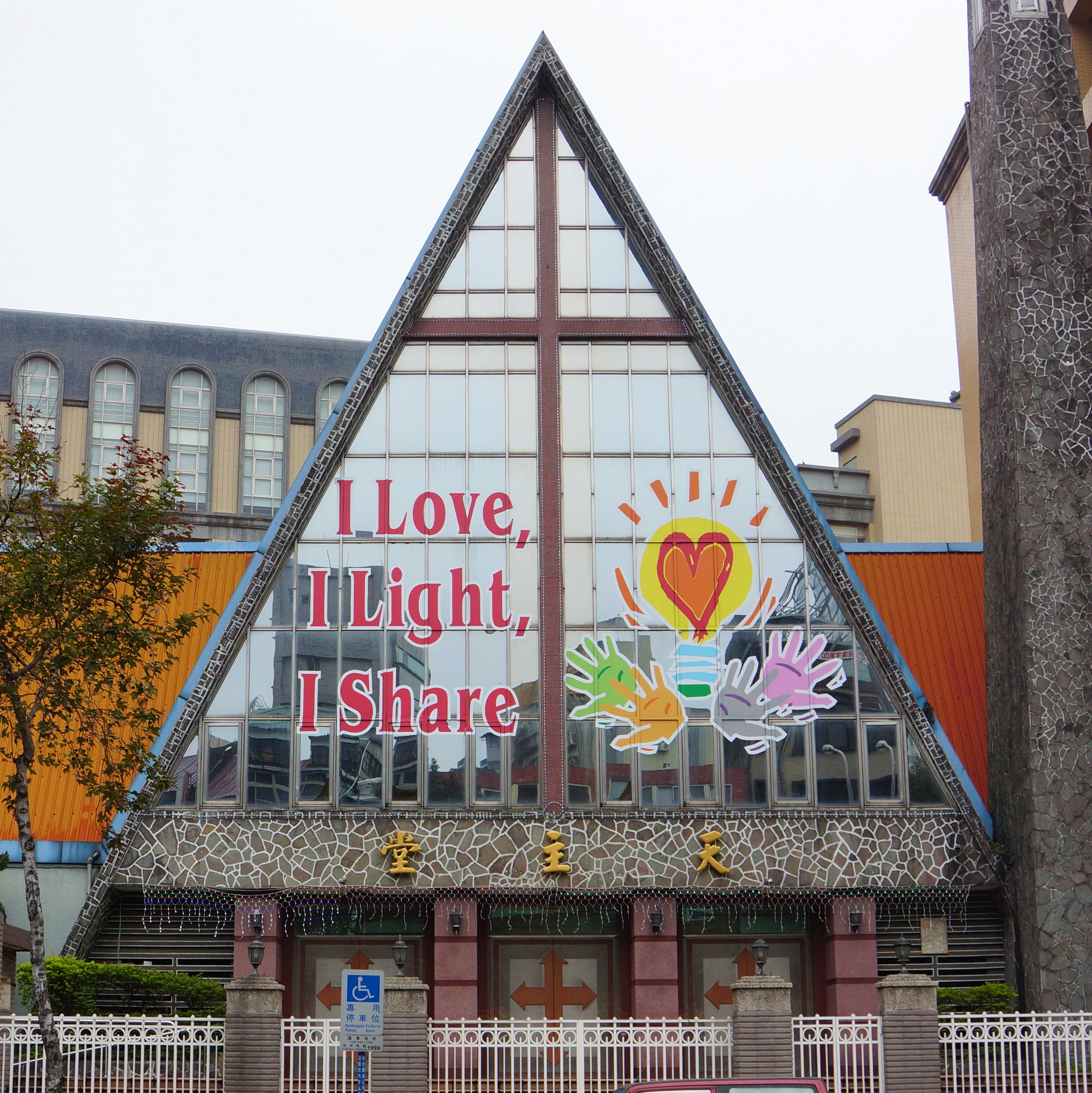
- Immaculate Conception Cathedral
- Location: Datong, Taipei, Taiwan
- Denomination: Roman Catholic

Architecture
- Functional status: Active
- Groundbreaking: 1959
- Completed: May 1961

Administration
- Archdiocese: Roman Catholic Archdiocese of Taipei

Clergy
- Archbishop: Thomas Aquinas Chung An-zu

The Immaculate Conception Cathedral (Chinese: 聖母無原罪主教座堂; pinyin: Shèngmǔwú Yuánzuì Zhǔjiào Zuòtáng) is a Roman Catholic cathedral in Datong District, Taipei, Taiwan. The Latin Rite church serves as the see of the Metropolitan Archdiocese of Taipei (Archidioecesis Taipehensis; 天主教臺北總教區) created by Pope Pius XII with the Bull "Gravia illa Christi".

== History ==
The original building was built by Spanish in 1629, but was destroyed in a raid. Between 1911 and 1914, a new church was built in the Gothic style. Towards the end of World War II, the church was one of many buildings damaged by the air raid. Reconstruction began in 1959 of the church, albeit much simpler than the original, and was completed in May 1961.

== Activities ==
All Masses and other religious services in the cathedral are offered in Mandarin Chinese.

== Transportation ==
The church is accessible within walking distance west of Shuanglian Station of the Taipei Metro.

== See also ==
- Roman Catholicism in Taiwan

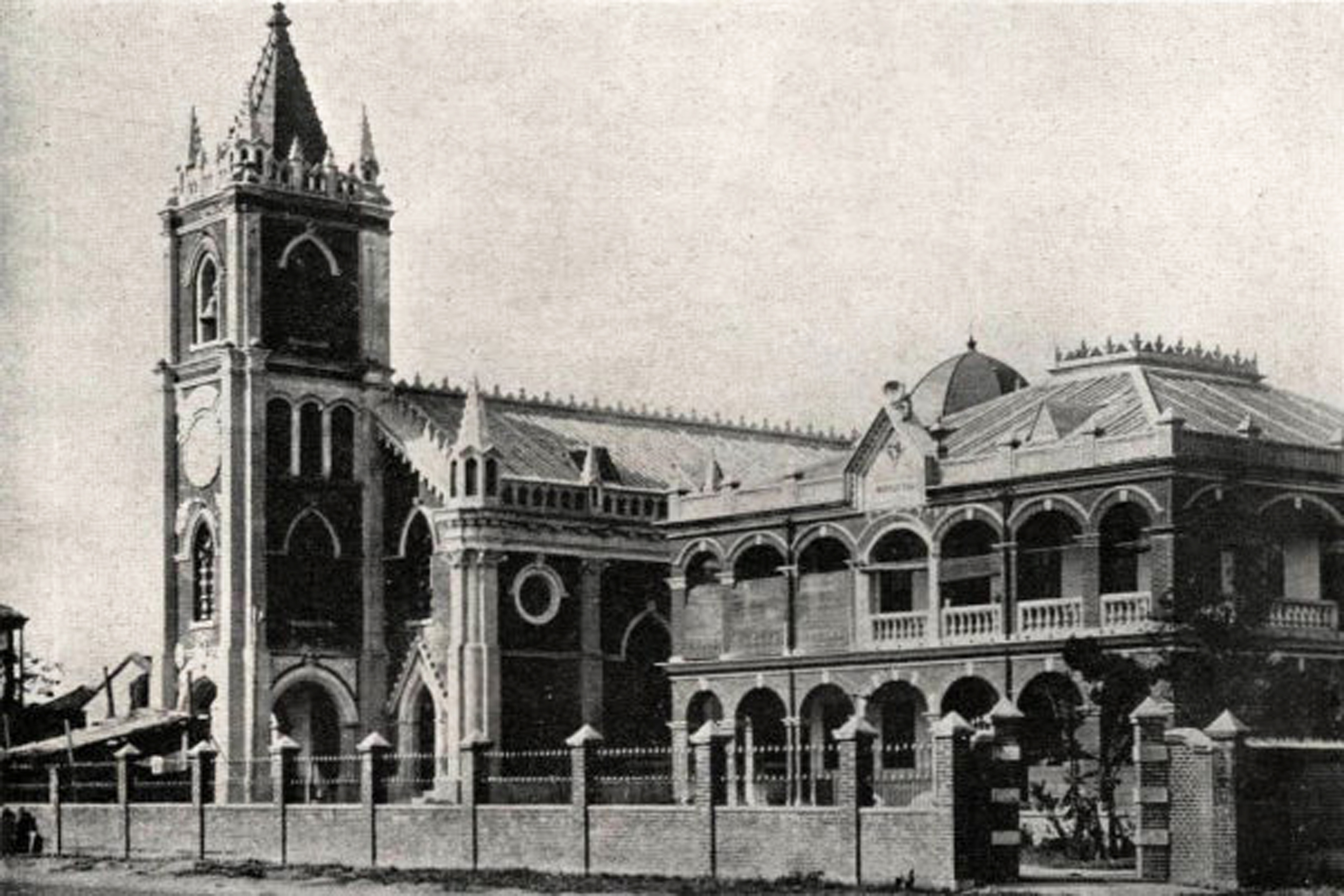
Former Cathedral of Taipei in 1889
