= Diocese of Kaohsiung =

Roman Catholic diocese in Taiwan

Coordinates: 22.6204°N 120.2916°E

Diocese of Kaohsiung Dioecesis Kaohsiungensis 天主教高雄教區
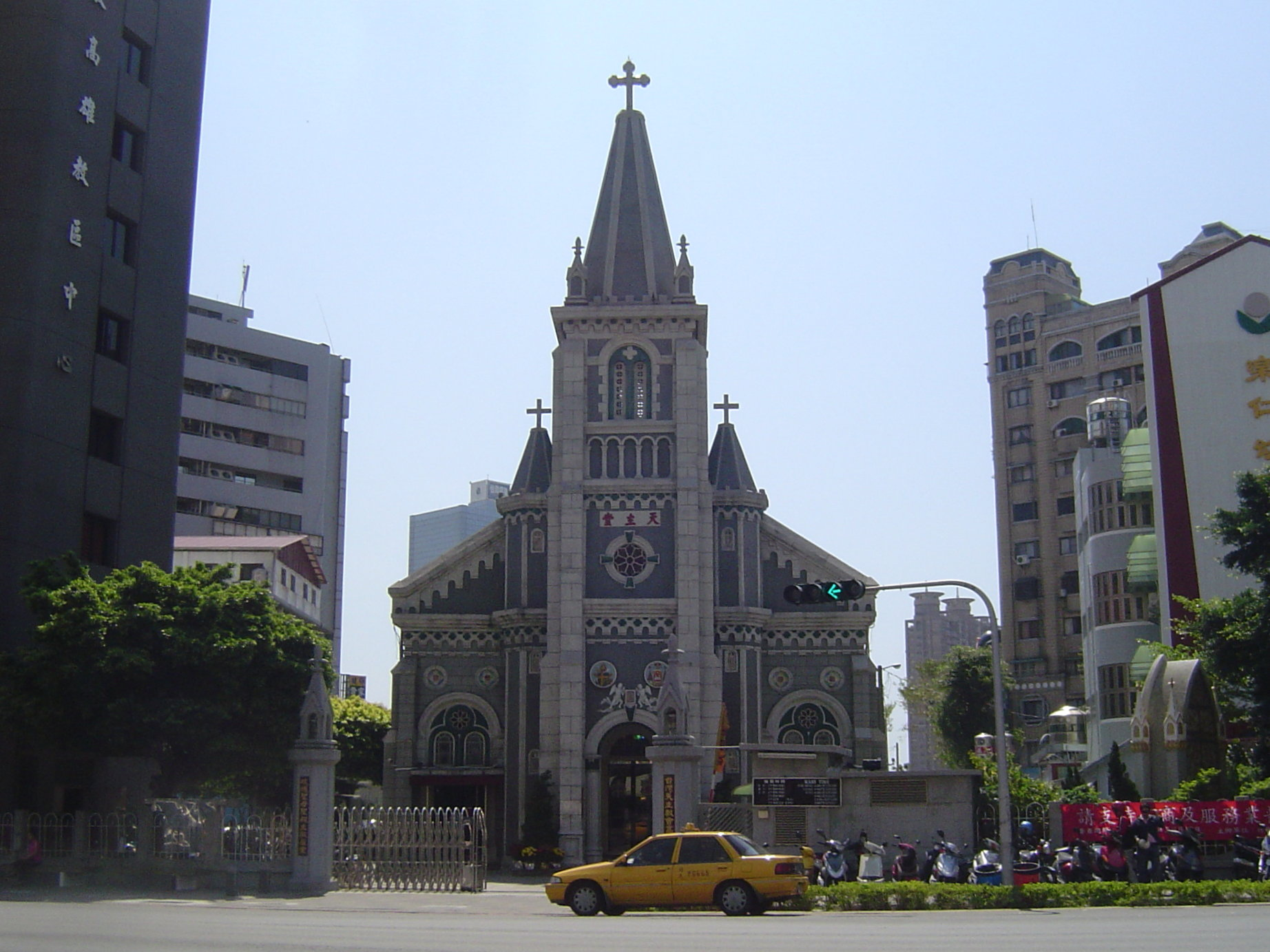
- Holy Rosary Cathedral, Kaohsiung

Location
- Country: Taiwan
- Territory: Kaohsiung and Pingtung County
- Ecclesiastical province: Taipei
- Deaneries: 9

Statistics
- Area: 5,723 km^{2} (2,210 sq mi)
- Population: Total; Catholics: (as of 2017); 3,606,851; 37,814 (1.0%)
- Parishes: 60
- Churches: 111
- Members: 35,781

Information
- Denomination: Roman Catholic
- Sui iuris church: Latin Church
- Rite: Roman Rite
- Established: July 19, 1913; 112 years ago
- Cathedral: Holy Rosary Cathedral, Kaohsiung
- Patron saint: Our Lady of Rosary
- Secular priests: 35

Current leadership
- Pope: Leo XIV
- Bishop: Peter Liu Cheng-chung
- Metropolitan Archbishop: Thomas Chung An-zu
- Vicar General: Rt. Msgr. Anthony Huang Chung-wei
- Episcopal Vicars: Rev. Vincent Li Han-min OP; Rev. Dominic Yung-Hsiung Tu

Map
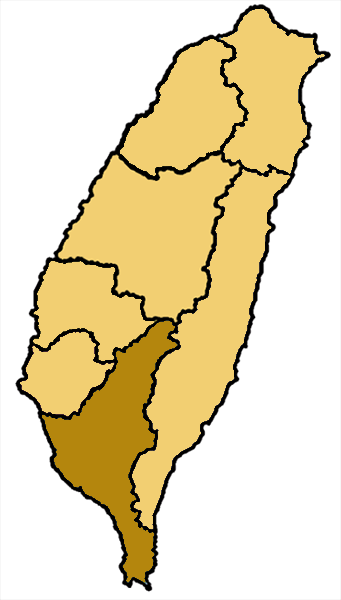

Website
- Website of the Diocese

The Diocese of Kaohsiung (Lat: Dioecesis Kaohsiungensis) is a Latin Church diocese of the Catholic Church in Taiwan.

The diocese has the distinction of being the first Catholic ecclesiastical territory erected on the island of Taiwan. Created as the Apostolic Prefecture of the Island of Formosa in 1913, the name was changed to the Apostolic Prefecture of Kaohsiung in 1949. In 1961, the Prefecture was elevated to a full diocese, and became a suffragan to the Archdiocese of Taipei.

The current bishop is Peter Liu Cheng-chung, appointed in January 2006. In November 2009, he was given the "ad personam" (personal) title of archbishop by Pope Benedict XVI.

== Ordinaries ==
- Clemente Fernández, O.P. † (1913 Appointed – 1921 Died)
- Thomas de la Hoz, O.P. † (27 Jul 1921 Appointed – 1935 Died)
- Joseph Asajiro Satowaki, † (1941 Appointed – 1946)
- Joseph Arregui y Yparaguirre, O.P. † (5 Mar 1948 Appointed – 1961 Died)
- Joseph Cheng Tien-Siang, O.P. † (21 Mar 1961 Appointed – 19 Aug 1990 Died)
- Paul Shan Kuo-hsi, S.J. † (4 Mar 1991 Appointed – 5 Jan 2006 Retired)
- Peter Liu Cheng-chung (5 Jan 2006 Succeeded – present)

== See also ==
- Catholic Church in Taiwan
