= Paul Shan Kuo-hsi =

Taiwanese Roman Catholic cardinal

His Eminence Paul Shan Kuo-hsi SJ
- Cardinal, Bishop of Kaohsiung
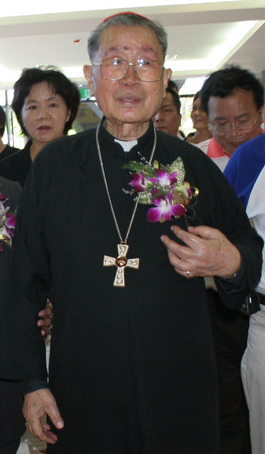
- Cardinal Shan
- See: Kaohsiung
- Installed: 17 June 1991
- Term ended: 5 January 2006
- Predecessor: Joseph Cheng Tien-Siang
- Successor: Peter Liu Cheng-chung
- Other post: Cardinal-Priest of San Crisogono (1998–2012)

Orders
- Ordination: 1955
- Consecration: 1980
- Created cardinal: 21 February 1998

Personal details
- Born: 3 December 1924 Puyang, Zhili, China
- Died: 22 August 2012 (aged 87) New Taipei City, Taiwan
- Denomination: Catholic
- Motto: INSTAURARE OMNIA IN CHRISTO

Styles of Paul Shan Kuo-hsi
- Reference style: His Eminence
- Spoken style: Your Eminence
- Informal style: Cardinal
- See: Kaohsiung (emeritus)

Paul Shan Kuo-hsi, S.J. (Chinese: 單國璽; pinyin: Shàn Guóxǐ; 3 December 1924 – 22 August 2012) was a cardinal in the Catholic Church. He was at times the bishop of Hualien and Kaohsiung, Taiwan, and the chairman of Fu Jen Catholic University.

== Biography ==
Kuo-hsi was born in Puyang, Zhili province (now Puyang, Henan province) of China. He joined the Society of Jesus on September 11, 1946, took religious vows, September 12, 1948, and final vows on February 2, 1963. He was ordained on March 18, 1955, in Baguio, Philippines.

He attended St. Joseph Regional Seminary, Chiughsien and then Berchmans College, Manila, where he earned a licentiate in philosophy. He went on to attend Bellarmine College, Baguio, Philippines, being awarded a licentiate in theology. He also attended the Xavier University earning a diploma in education science and finally the Pontifical Gregorian University in Rome where he was awarded a doctorate in theology. Besides Mandarin, his first language, he also spoke Latin, English, French, Italian, Spanish and Portuguese.

After his ordination to the priesthood in 1955, he did further studies in Novaliches from 1955 to 1957. He then served as director of the Chinese section of Sacred Heart School, Cebu from 1957 to 1959, after which he took time to pursue doctoral studies in Rome. He served as assistant master of novices in Thu Duc, Vietnam, from 1959 to 1963, then master of novices and rector of Manresa House, Changhua, Taiwan from 1963 to 1970. He went on to serve as rector of St. Ignatius Institute in Taipei from 1970 to 1976 and president of the Catholic Schools Association, Taiwan, from 1972 to 1976. He was appointed episcopal vicar of Taipei in 1976, holding the post until 1979.

He was appointed Bishop of the Roman Catholic Diocese of Hualien, in Hualien, Taiwan, on November 15, 1979, by Pope John Paul II, and after his episcopal consecration was installed as Bishop of Hualien on February 14, 1981. After his service there, he was transferred and appointed Bishop of the Roman Catholic Diocese of Kaohsiung, in Kaohsiung, Taiwan, also by Pope John Paul II, on March 4, 1991. He was installed as Bishop of Kaohsiung on June 17, 1991.

He was appointed Cardinal-Priest of the Titulus S. Chrysogoni by Pope John Paul II on February 21, 1998, and was, following the death of Cardinal Ignatius Kung in 2000, and then Cardinal John Wu in 2002, and before the elevation of Cardinal Joseph Zen, the only known living Chinese Cardinal. (A Cardinal appointed in pectore by Pope John Paul II in 2003 was rumored to reside in mainland China, but that appointment expired with the Pontiff's death since the Cardinal's name was never published.) He retired in January 2006 and died on Wednesday, August 22, 2012, after a pneumonia infection, having suffered from lung cancer since his diagnosis in August 2006, eight months after his retirement.

Catholic Church titles
Preceded by Bernard Yago	Cardinal Priest of San Crisogono; 1998–2012	Succeeded by Andrew Yeom Soo-jung
Preceded by Matthew Kia	Bishop of Hualien; 1979–1991	Succeeded by Andrew Tsien
Preceded by Joseph Cheng	Bishop of Kaohsiung; 1991–2006	Succeeded by Peter Liu
