= Diocese of Chiayi =

Roman Catholic diocese in Taiwan

Coordinates: 23.4844°N 120.4611°E

Diocese of Chiayi Dioecesis Kiayiensis 天主教嘉義教區

Location
- Country: Taiwan
- Territory: Chiayi and counties of Chiayi and Yunlin
- Ecclesiastical province: Taipei
- Metropolitan: Taipei
- Archdeaconries: 7

Statistics
- Area: 3,244 km^{2} (1,253 sq mi)
- Population: Total; Catholics: (as of 2006); 1,582,934; 17,820 (1.1%)
- Members: 7,058

Information
- Denomination: Roman Catholic
- Sui iuris church: Latin Church
- Rite: Roman Rite
- Cathedral: Cathedral of St John in Chiayi City
- Patron saint: St. John the Evangelist
- Secular priests: 20

Current leadership
- Pope: Leo XIV
- Bishop: Norbert Pasuya Poicong Ü
- Metropolitan Archbishop: Thomas Chung An-zu

Map
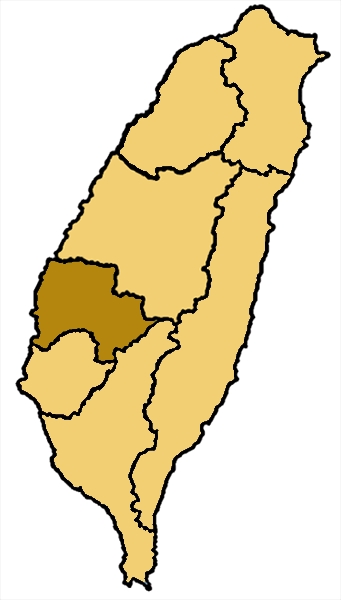

Website
- Website of the Diocese

Diocese of Chiayi

Chinese name
- Traditional Chinese: 天主教嘉義教區
- Simplified Chinese: 天主教嘉義教区
Transcriptions
Standard Mandarin
- Hanyu Pinyin: tiān zhǔ jiào Jiāyì jiàoqū
- Wade–Giles: T'iēnchǔchiào Chā-ì chiàoch'ǘ
- Tongyong Pinyin: tiān jhǔ jiào Jiāyì jiàocyū
- Yale Romanization: tyān jǔ jyàu Jyāyì jyàuchyū
Southern Min
- Hokkien POJ: Thian-chú-kàu Ka-gī kàu-khu

Latin name
- Latin: Dioecesis Kiayiensis

The Diocese of Chiayi (Latin: Dioecesis Kiayiensis) is a Latin Church diocese of the Catholic Church in Taiwan.

Originally erected as an Apostolic Prefecture of Chiayi in 1952, the Prefecture was elevated to a full diocese in 1962. The diocese is a suffragan of the Archdiocese of Taipei. Also spelled the Diocese of Kiayi, it covers "Chiayi city and the counties of Chiayi and Yunlin."

== Ordinaries ==
- Matthew Kia Yen-wen (21 May 1970 Appointed – 14 Dec 1974 Appointed, Bishop of Hwalien)
- Joseph Ti-kang (21 Jun 1975 Appointed – 3 May 1985 Appointed, Coadjutor Archbishop of Taipei)
- Joseph Lin Thien-chu † (25 Nov 1985 Appointed – 4 Mar 1994 Died)
- Peter Liu Cheng-chung (1 Jul 1994 Appointed – 5 Jul 2004 Appointed, Coadjutor Bishop of Kaohsiung)
- John Hung Shan-chuan, S.V.D. (16 Jan 2006 Appointed – 9 Nov 2007 Appointed, Archbishop of Taipei)
- Thomas Chung An-Zu (24 Jan 2008 Appointed – 23 May 2020 Appointed, Archbishop of Taipei)
- Norbert Pasuya Poicong Ü Pu Ying-hsiung (15 Feb 2022 Appointed – present)

== See also ==
- Catholic Church in Taiwan
