= Thomas Chung An-Zu =

Archbishop of Taipei

His Excellency, The Most Reverend Thomas Chung An-Zu
- Archbishop of Taipei; Apostolic Administrator of Kinmen or Quemoy Islands and Matzu
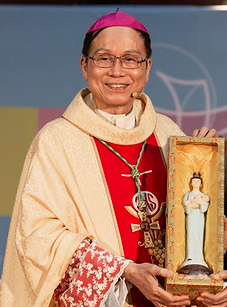
- Native name: 鍾安住
- Archdiocese: Taipei
- Appointed: 23 May 2020
- Installed: 18 July 2020
- Predecessor: John Hung Shan-chuan
- Successor: Incumbent
- Previous post: Bishop of Roman Catholic Diocese of Chiayi

Orders
- Ordination: 26 December 1981
- Consecration: 30 December 2006 by Joseph Cheng Tsai-fa

Personal details
- Born: 7 August 1952 (age 74) Yunlin County, Taiwan
- Denomination: Roman Catholic
- Motto: Deum et hominem amare
- Coat of arms: Thomas Chung An-Zu's coat of arms

Thomas Chung An-Zu (born 7 August 1952) is the current serving archbishop of the Roman Catholic Archdiocese of Taipei and Apostolic Administrator of Kinmen or Quemoy Islands and Matzu.

== Early life ==
Chung was born in Yunlin County in Taiwan on 7 August 1952.

== Priesthood ==
On 26 December 1981, Chung was ordained a priest for the Roman Catholic diocese of Tainan.

== Episcopate ==
Pope Benedict XVI appointed Chung as the Auxiliary Bishop of Taipei, Taiwan and Titular Bishop of Munatiana on 31 October 2006. He was consecrated a bishop on 30 December 2006 by Archbishop Joseph Cheng Tsai-fa. He was appointed bishop of Roman Catholic Diocese of Chiayi on 24 January 2008.

Pope Francis later appointed him as Archbishop of Roman Catholic Archdiocese of Taipei and Apostolic Administrator of Kinmen or Quemoy Islands and Matzu, Taiwan on 23 May 2020.

Chung is the Grand Prior of the Taiwan Lieutenancy of the Equestrian Order of the Holy Sepulchre of Jerusalem.
