= Archdiocese of Taipei =

Roman Catholic archdiocese in Taiwan

Coordinates: 25.0574°N 121.5150°E

Archdiocese of Taipei Archidioecesis Taipehensis 天主教臺北總敎區
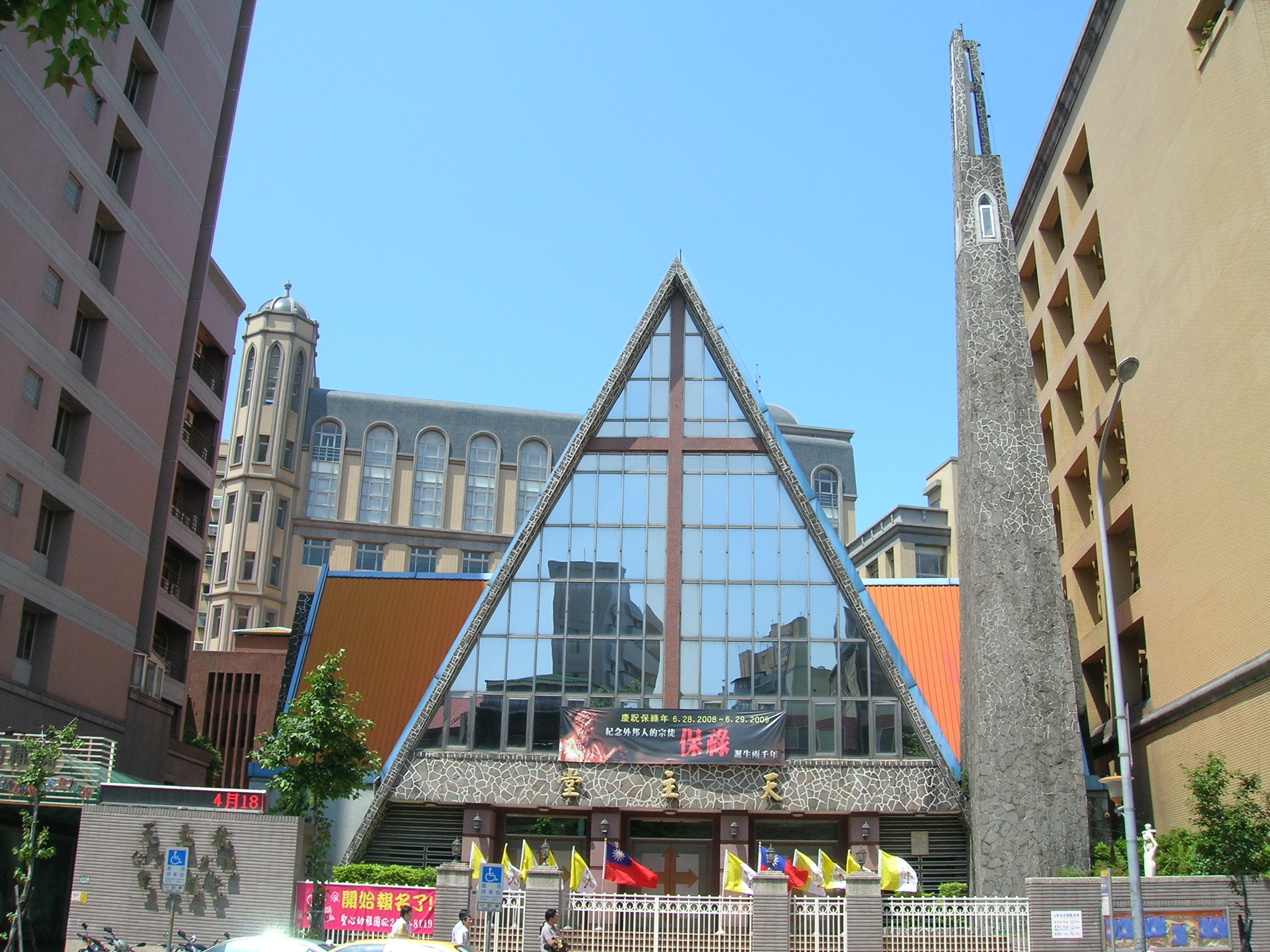
- Immaculate Conception Cathedral

Location
- Country: Taiwan
- Territory: Taipei, Keelung, New Taipei City, and Yilan County
- Ecclesiastical province: Taipei
- Archdeaconries: 10

Statistics
- Area: 4,590 km^{2} (1,770 sq mi)
- Population: Total; Catholics: (as of 2010); 7,331,027; 38,037 (0.5%)
- Parishes: 84
- Schools: 54
- Members: 55,383 (2024)

Information
- Denomination: Roman Catholic
- Sui iuris church: Latin Church
- Rite: Roman Rite
- Established: 30 December 1949
- Cathedral: Cathedral of The Immaculate Conception in Taipei
- Patron saint: Our Lady of Immaculate Conception
- Secular priests: 36

Current leadership
- Pope: Leo XIV
- Archbishop: Thomas Chung An-Zu
- Auxiliary Bishops: Peter Chao Yung-Chi
- Vicar General: Paulus Sun Chih-ching; Paul Lin Tien-Deh
- Bishops emeritus: John Hung Shan-Chuan Archbishop Emeritus (2007-2020)

Map
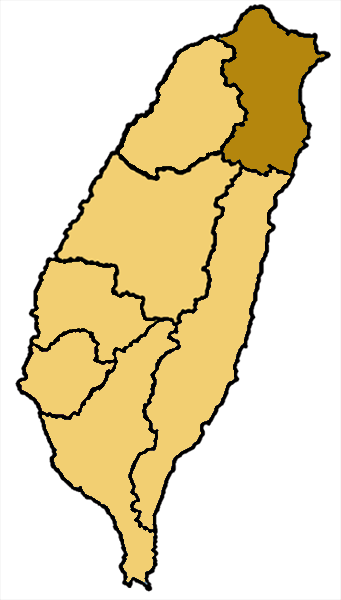

Website
- Website of the Archdiocese

Archdiocese of Taipei

Chinese name
- Traditional Chinese: 天主教臺北總敎區
Transcriptions
Standard Mandarin
- Hanyu Pinyin: tiān zhǔ jiào Táipěi zǒng jiàoqū
- Wade–Giles: T'iēnchǔchiào Táip'ěi tsǔngchiàoch'ǘ
- Tongyong Pinyin: tiān jhǔ jiào Táipěi zǒng jiàocyū
- Yale Romanization: tyān jǔ jyàu Táiběi dzǔng jyàuchyū
Southern Min
- Hokkien POJ: Thian-chú-kàu Tâi-pak Cháng-kàu-khu

Latin name
- Latin: Archidioecesis Taipehensis

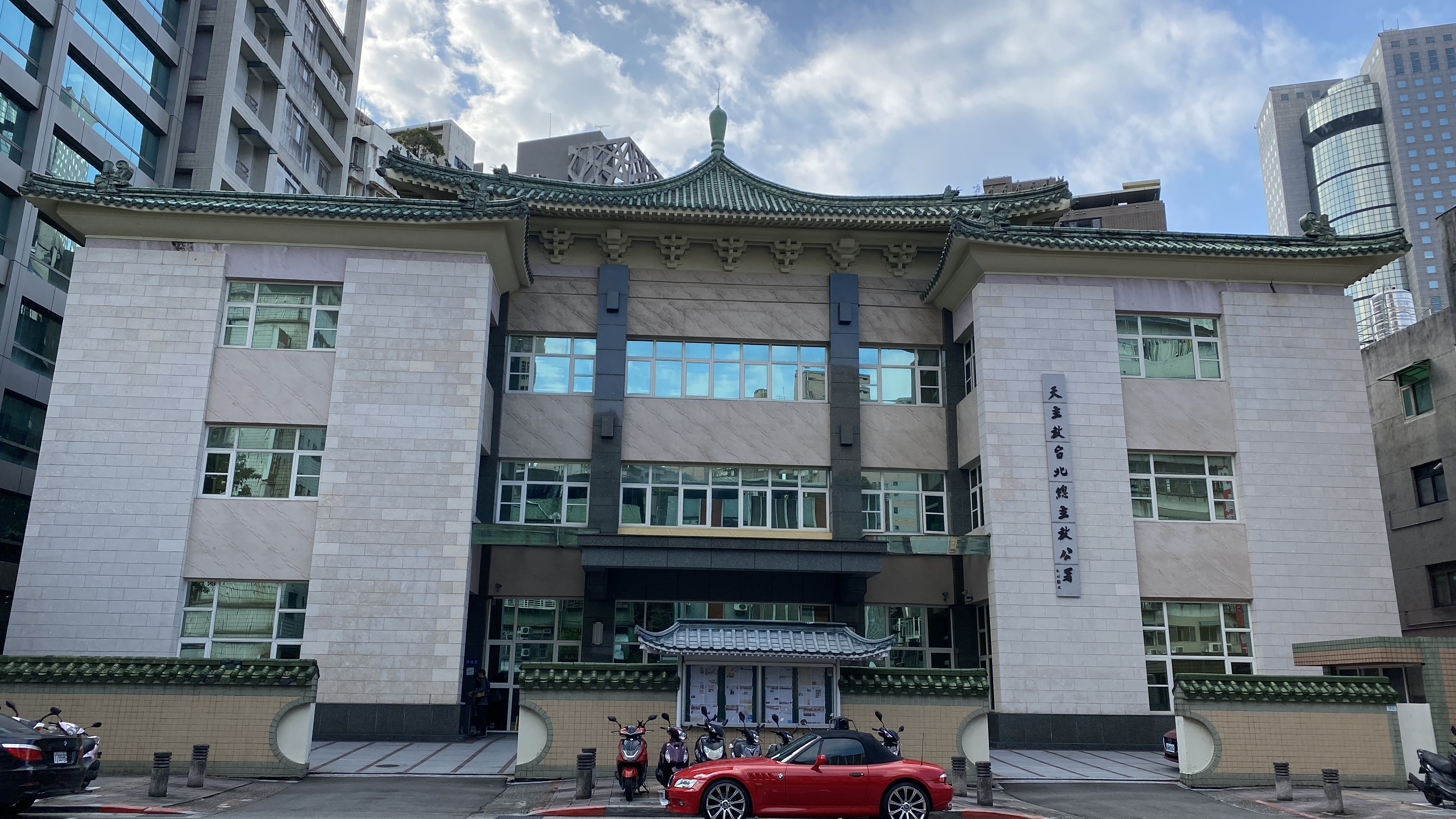
Taipei Archdiocesan Curia Building at Leli Road, Taipei

The Archdiocese of Taipei (Latin: Archidioecesis Taipehensis) is a Latin Church archdiocese of the Catholic Church in Taiwan. Pope Pius XII erected it as the Apostolic Prefecture of Taipei on 30 December 1949. On 7 August 1952, it was elevated to an archdiocese, with the suffragan sees of Chiayi, Hsinchu, Hualien, Kaohsiung, Taichung, and Tainan.

The archdiocese's cathedral is the Cathedral of the Immaculate Conception. As the only metropolitan in Taiwan, it is the principal episcopal see of that country. Pope Francis accepted the mandatory resignation of John Hung Shan-chuan upon reaching retirement age and appointed Thomas Chung An-zu as Archbishop of Taipei on 23 May 2020. For many years, each person appointed Archbishop of Taipei has also been appointed as Apostolic Administrator of the Kinmen and Matsu islands, which form part of the Diocese of Xiamen.

== List of Ordinaries of Taipei ==
- Joseph Kuo Joshih CDD (13 June 1950 Appointed – 4 December 1959 Resigned)
  - Cardinal Thomas Tien Ken-Sin SVD (Apostolic Administrator, 16 December 1959 Appointed – 15 February 1966 Retired)
- Stanislaus Lo Kuang (15 February 1966 Appointed – 5 August 1978 Resigned)
- Matthew Kia Yen-Wen (15 November 1978 Appointed – 11 February 1989 Resigned)
- Joseph Ti-kang (11 February 1989 Succeeded – 24 January 2004 Retired)
- Joseph Cheng Tsai-fa (24 January 2004 Appointed – 9 November 2007 Retired)
- John Hung Shan-Chuan SVD (9 November 2007 Appointed – 23 May 2020 Retired)
- Thomas Chung An-Zu (23 May 2020 Appointed – present)
  - Msgr. Peter Chao Yung-chi (Auxiliary Bishop, consecrated on 3 April 2025)

== See also ==
- Roman Catholicism in Taiwan
- List of Roman Catholic dioceses in Taiwan
