= Taiwan Youth Day =

Taiwan Youth Day 台灣青年日
- Status: Active
- Genre: Religious festival
- Frequency: Annual
- Location: Taiwan
- Inaugurated: 2004
- Organizer: Dioceses of Taiwan (by rotation)
- Sponsor: Youth Desk of the Chinese Regional Bishops' Conference

Taiwan Youth Day (TYD; Chinese: 台灣青年日) is a youth-oriented Catholic Church event in Taiwan, organized by Youth Desk of Chinese Regional Bishops' Conference (CRBC). Seven dioceses in Taiwan take turn to plan and execute TYD. In 2004, the first ever TYD was created and it was decided to hold it every three years. However, in 2008, they have decided to have the TYD once a year.

== Purpose ==
During the meeting week, young adults enrich their spirituality through prayer, personal development, and faith sharing. At the same time, the organization hopes to encourage more youths to discover and renew their faith and to proclaim the word of the lord with justice and peace.

== Origin ==
In 2004, several young adults returned from the World Youth Day, gathered, and decided to create a similar experience where young Taiwanese Catholics can come together and support each other in group gatherings. Since then, they have also begun to encourage other youth desks to work together and build a network with each other. Ever since the first TYD, youth leaders from each Taiwanese archdiocese have gathered and worked towards creating an Asian Youth Day or an International experience where the Catholics from all over can come together and share their culture, language, and ethnicity.

== Chronology of celebrations ==
#	Year	Date	Host	Theme	Contents
1st	2004	October 1–3	Youth Desk of CRBC	Walk toward God, Walk toward love (Chinese: 向主走，向愛走)	The 1st Taiwan Youth Day was held at Hsieh Wei Memorial Camp in Puli, Nantou. Originally it was planned to be held on August 12–15, but it was postponed due to Typhoon Rananim.
2nd	2007	August 22–27	Youth Desk of CRBC, Diocese of Tainan	As I have loved you so you also should love one another (Chinese: 就如我愛了你們，你們應當彼此相愛) (Jn 13:34)	The 2nd Taiwan Youth Day was held in Tainan. The site of the camp was at Tsengwen Youth Activity Center in Tainan County. This was the first year to have homestay for campers for staying overnight.
3rd	2008	October 9–12	Archdiocese of Taipei	Receive the POWER, to be your witnesses (Chinese: 領受聖神的德能，為主作證) (Ac 1:3-8)	The 3rd Taiwan Youth Day was held in Taipei. Besides the site of the camp at Chientan Youth Activity Center, there was also evangelization activities held at Da'an Forest Park, Gongguan and East End. About 500 youths from different parts of Taiwan participated that year. Starting from this year, Taiwan Youth Day is held annually instead of once every three years, and the seven dioceses of Taiwan take turns hosting TYD.
4th	2009	August 19–22	Diocese of Hsinchu	Youth stand up, have hope for Taiwan: My Thoughts, My Words, My path with Christ (Chinese: 年輕人‧站出來‧讓台灣‧有希望——我思，我言，我行跟耶穌一young)	The 4th Taiwan Youth Day was held in Taichung. The site of the camp was at Stella Matutina Girls' High School in Taichung City. Besides the main site of the camp in Downtown Taichung, evangelization activities were also held in various areas throughout Downtown Taichung, there were and "Centuries Historical Church Tour" programme in Changhua County, and the evening concert for evangelization at Fu-shun Park in North District, Taichung.
5th	2010	August 23–28	Diocese of Hsinchu	Good Teacher, what must I do to inherit eternal life? (Chinese: 善師，為承受永生，我該做什麼) (Mk 10:17)	The 5th Taiwan Youth Day was held in Hsinchu. The site of the camp was at St. Peter High School in Hsinchu City. There were host families to house the participants, so that the youth from other parts of Taiwan would have different experience of life. There were also other activities throughout Taoyuan County (now Taoyuan City), Hsinchu County, and Miaoli County.
6th	2011	July 14–17	Diocese of Kaohsiung	Love & Communion: Instaurare omnia in Christo (Chinese: 愛‧融合——在耶穌基督內重建一切)	The 6th Taiwan Youth Day was held in Kaohsiung. The site of the camp was at St. Dominic High School in Downtown Kaohsiung.
7th	2012	TBD	Diocese of Chiayi	TBD	The 7th Taiwan Youth Day will be held in Chiayi.
8th	2013	TBD	Diocese of Hualien	TBD	The 8th Taiwan Youth Day will be held in Hualien.

== See also ==
- Roman Catholicism in Taiwan
- Chinese Catholic Bishops Conference
- World Youth Day
- Asian Youth Day
