= Immaculate Heart of Mary Cathedral, Hsinchu =

Coordinates: 24°48′33.7″N 120°58′00.7″E

Immaculate Heart of Mary Cathedral
- Sacred Heart Cathedral of Our Lady
- 聖母聖心主教座堂
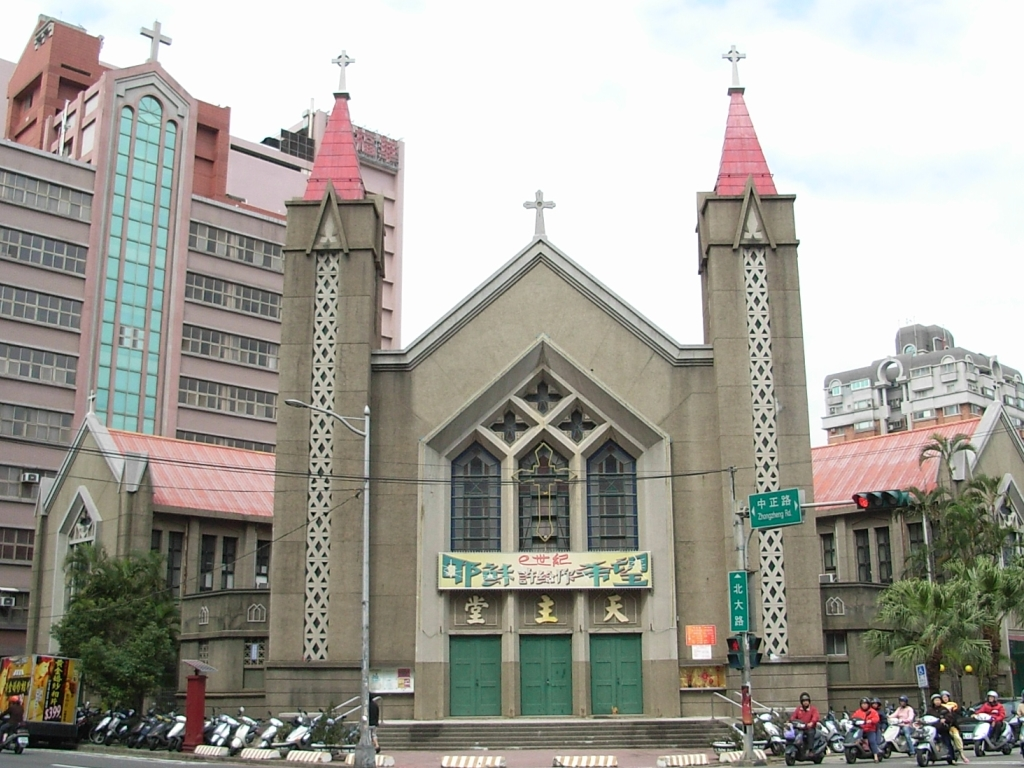
- Immaculate Heart of Mary Cathedral
- Location: North, Hsinchu City, Taiwan
- Country: Taiwan
- Denomination: Roman Catholic Church

History
- Status: Cathedral

Architecture
- Functional status: Active
- Completed: October 1957

Specifications
- Capacity: 1,000 worshippers

Administration
- Archdiocese: Roman Catholic Archdiocese of Taipei
- Diocese: Roman Catholic Diocese of Hsinchu

Clergy
- Archbishop: Thomas Chung An-Zu
- Bishop: John Lee Keh-Mien

The Immaculate Heart of Mary Cathedral (Chinese: 聖母聖心主教座堂) also known as the Sacred Heart Cathedral of Our Lady or North Church where it is located, is a religious building that is affiliated with the Catholic Church and is located in North District, Hsinchu City, Taiwan.

The current building was opened for religious services in October 1957 with a capacity of 1,000 people. She arrived some religious who were expelled or fled from the mainland by what at first had difficulty adapting to the local Chinese dialects.

The temple follows the Roman or Latin rite and serves as the seat of Roman Catholic Diocese of Hsinchu (Dioecesis Hsinchuensis; 天主教新竹教區) which was created in 1961 by the Bull "In Taipehensi" of Pope John XXIII. It is under the pastoral responsibility of the Bishop John Baptist Lee Keh-mien.

== Transportation ==
The cathedral is accessible within walking distance north of Hsinchu Station of Taiwan Railway.

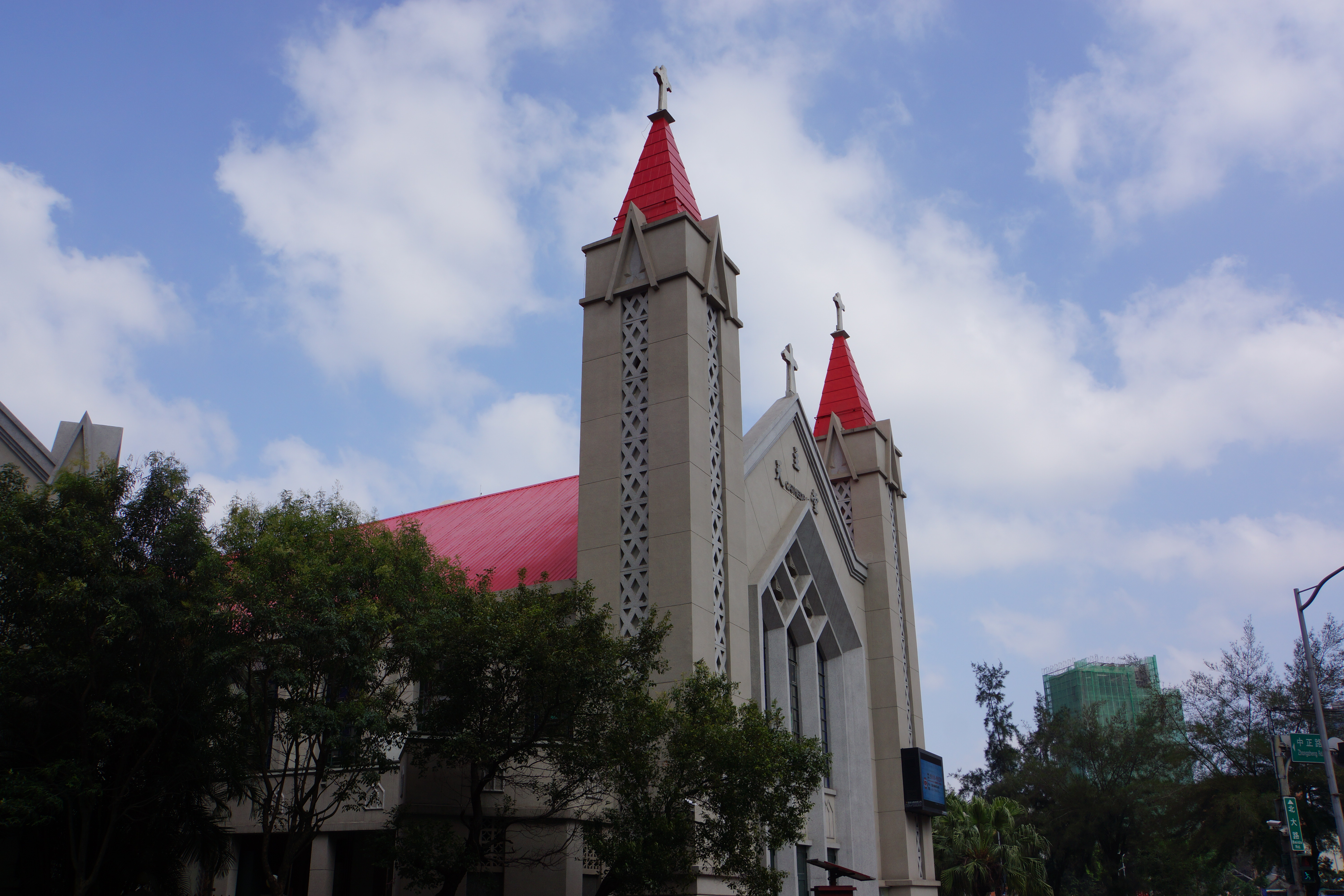
Another View

== See also ==
- Catholic Church in Taiwan
- Immaculate Heart of Mary Cathedral
