= Cathedral of Christ the Saviour, Taichung =

Church in Central, Taichung, Taiwan

Cathedral of Christ the Saviour
- 天主教耶穌救世主總堂
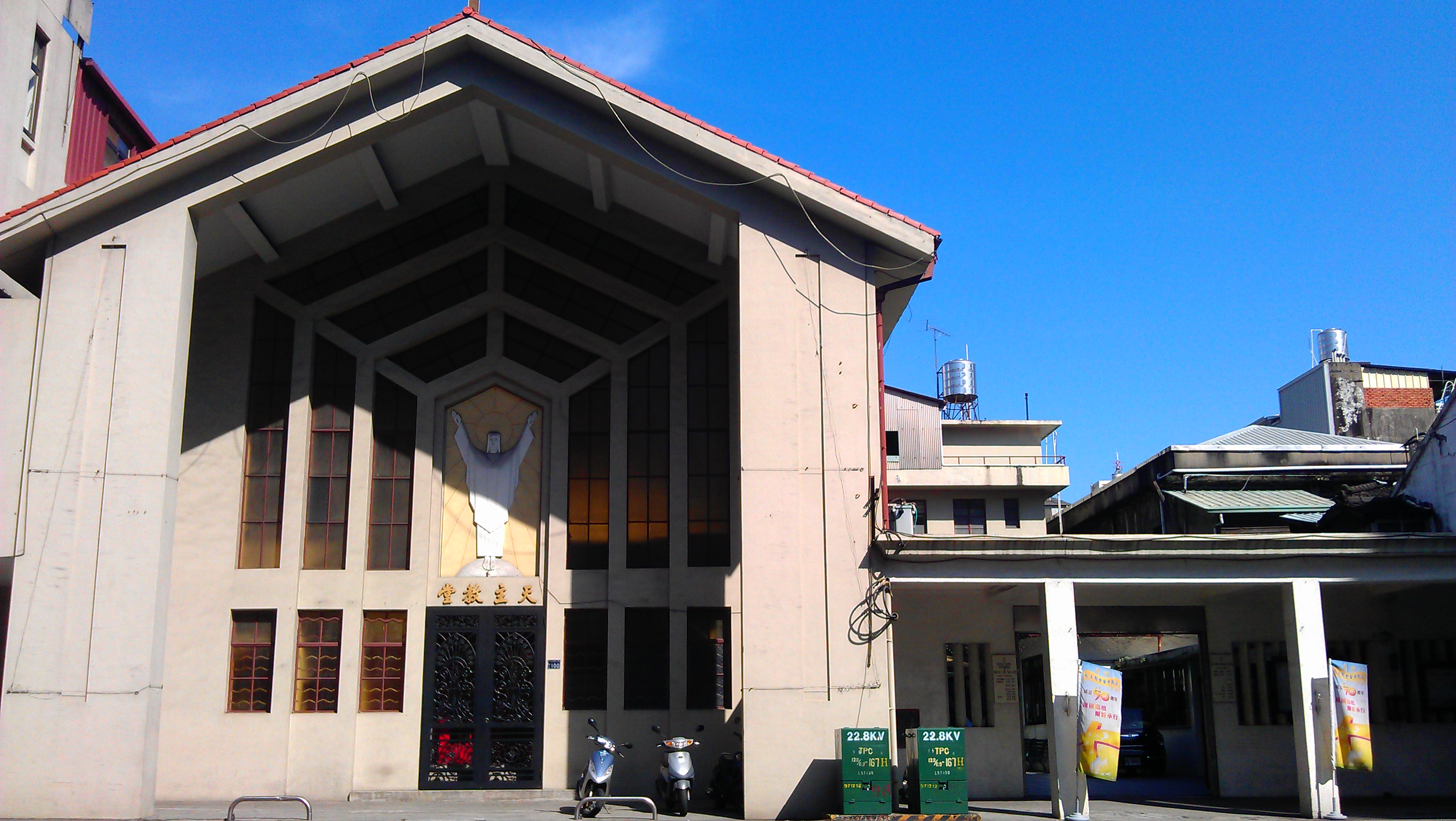
- Cathedral of Christ the Saviour
- 24°08′34″N 120°40′48″E
- Location: No. 100, Section 2, Sanmin Road, Central District, Taichung
- Country: Taiwan
- Denomination: Roman Catholicism
- Website: Parish website (English); Diocese of Taichung page

History
- Founded: 1915
- Dedication: Christ the Saviour

Architecture
- Architect: Brother Albert Staubli
- Groundbreaking: 1957
- Completed: 1958

Administration
- Diocese: Diocese of Taichung

Clergy
- Bishop: Su Yao-Wen
- Priest: Vicar General Huang Ching-Fu

The Cathedral of Christ the Saviour (Chinese: 天主教耶穌救世主總堂) is the cathedral of the Roman Catholic Diocese of Taichung. It is located at No. 100, Section 2, Sanmin Road, Central District, Taichung, Taiwan.

The parish was established in 1915. Construction of the present church began in 1957 and was completed in 1958.

The cathedral follows the Roman Rite and is the principal church of the Diocese of Taichung (Dioecesis Taichungensis). The territory was established as an apostolic prefecture in 1950 and entrusted to Maryknoll. On April 16, 1962, Pope John XXIII elevated it to a diocese. William F. Kupfer (蔡文興) was installed as its first bishop at the cathedral on September 23, 1962. The current bishop is Su Yao-Wen (蘇耀文).

== History ==
=== The Dominican Period (1914–1950) ===
The first church building (1915).

Father Angel Rodriguez, the first resident pastor, who arrived in 1916.

The second church building, in use from 1919 to 1956.

Taiwan's first Catholic hymnal in the Taiwanese language, published at this church in 1927.

According to the parish's history, in 1914, Father Manuel Prat (馬守仁), a Dominican priest serving as pastor of the Catholic church in Luocuo, purchased land in central Taichung and established a mission station. In 1915, the property was converted into a two-story building, with a temporary chapel downstairs and living quarters for the priests upstairs. Father Angel Rodriguez (洪羅烈) arrived in February 1916 as the first resident pastor. In 1919, a second church was built on the same site: a red-brick Gothic building laid out in the shape of the Chinese character for "mountain" (山). Dedicated to the Sacred Heart of Jesus, it remained in use until 1956. In 1927, the pastor, Father Francisco Giner (高熙能), published Taiwan's first Catholic hymnal in the Taiwanese language at the Taichung church.

=== The Maryknoll Period (1950–2003) ===
Parishioners posing in front of the second church building on October 7, 1951.

In August 1950, the Holy See separated territory from the Apostolic Prefecture of Kaohsiung to establish the Apostolic Prefecture of Taichung, entrusting it to Maryknoll. In January 1951, Father William F. Kupfer was appointed its first apostolic prefect.

The present building is the parish's third church. Designed by Maryknoll Brother Albert Staubli (雅聞道), it was begun in 1957 during Father James T. Manning's (萬民寧) tenure as pastor. Construction was completed in 1958, and the church was consecrated by Kupfer, then Prefect Apostolic, and dedicated to Christ the Saviour. The relief of the Ascension above the main entrance is the work of sculptor Chen Hsia-Yu (陳夏雨).

In 1962, the apostolic prefecture was elevated to the Diocese of Taichung, and the church became its cathedral. Kupfer was installed there as the first bishop on September 23 of that year. In 1987, a visiting delegation from the Archdiocese of Daegu, South Korea, presented the cathedral with a relic of a Korean martyr for veneration.

=== The Diocesan Clergy Period (2003–Present) ===
Since 2003, the parish has been served by priests of the Diocese of Taichung. Construction of the activity center next to the church began during Father Hsu Shih-Chao's (徐世昭) tenure (2008–2014). His successor, Father Liu Lien-Yu (劉連玉), completed the center and renovated the church. In December 2014, the parish began a yearlong celebration of the centennial of its founding.

Chinese nameplate at the entrance

English nameplate at the entrance

Dedication stone, Easter 1958, laid by Kupfer as Prefect Apostolic

== Pastors ==
The parish lists the following pastors.

No.	Chinese name	Name	Tenure	Affiliation
Founder	馬守仁	Manuel Prat	1914–1916	Dominicans
1	洪羅烈	Angel Rodriguez	1916–1919	Dominicans
2	吳達查	Buenaventura Gordaliza	1919–1923	Dominicans
3	高熙能	Francisco Giner	1923–1937	Dominicans
4	陳若瑟	José Arregui	1937–1942	Dominicans
5	戴剛德	Constantino Montero	1942–1946	Dominicans
6	山繼慈	Felix Sanchez	1946–1950	Dominicans
7	馬西略	Marcelino Delgado	1950–1951	Dominicans
8	善理文	John J. Sullivan	1951–1953	Maryknoll
9	莫盛才	Mo Sheng-Tsai	1954–1956	Maryknoll
10	萬民寧	James T. Manning	1957–1959	Maryknoll
11	康健	John P. McKernan	1959–1965	Maryknoll
12	曾顯道	Eugene M. Murray	1965–1967	Maryknoll
13	紀道明	John B. Keaney	1967–2003	Maryknoll
14	劉徵祥	Liu Cheng-Hsiang	2003–2008	Diocese of Taichung
15	徐世昭	Hsu Shih-Chao	2008–2014	Diocese of Taichung
16	劉連玉	Liu Lien-Yu	2014–2020	Diocese of Taichung
17	黃清富	Huang Ching-Fu	2020–present	Diocese of Taichung

== Registered cultural artifacts ==
On August 25, 2022, the Taichung City Government registered the church's stone baptismal font, a cyanotype (blueprint) score of Taiwanese-language hymns (藍曬技法臺語聖歌古樂譜), register of the deceased, Confirmation Register 1, Baptismal Register 1, and Baptismal Register 2 as general antiquities under the municipality's cultural heritage designation system.

== See also ==
- Catholicism in Taiwan
- List of cathedrals in Taiwan
