= Hsin-Chu =

Hsinchu or Hsinchu City is a city in northern Taiwan.

Hsin-Chu or Hsinchi may also refer to:

== Places in Taiwan ==
- Hsinchu Air Base, an airbase in North District, Hsinchu City
- Hsinchu County, a county in north-western Taiwan
- Hsinchu Fish Harbor, a harbor inHsinchu City
- Hsinchu Hills, an area of hills stretching across Hsinchu County
- Hsinchu HSR station, an elevated station of the Taiwan High Speed Rail in Zhubei, Hsinchu County
- Hsinchu Science Park, an industrial park that straddles Hsinchu City and Hsinchu County
- Hsinchu TRA station, a railway station in East District, Hsinchu City
- Hsinchu Zoo, a zoo in East District, Hsinchu City

== Other uses ==
- Hsinchu American School, a private international school that offers grades 1–12 in Hsinchu, Taiwan
- Hsinchu Campaign (11 June – 2 August 1895), a military campaign during the Japanese invasion of Taiwan (1895)
- Hsinchu International School, a private international school that offers K–12 education in Hsinchu, Taiwan

== See also ==
- Xinzhu (disambiguation)
- 新竹 (disambiguation)
