= Chinese Regional Bishops' Conference =

Episcopal conference of Taiwan

- Abbreviation: CRBC (臺灣主教團)
- Formation: 1967
- Type: NGO
- Purpose: To deal with affairs relating to Catholics in Taiwan and to maintain contact with the Holy See and universal Church
- Headquarters: Taipei City, Taiwan
- Location: 39 An Ju Street, Da-an District
- Region served: Free Area of the Republic of China
- Members: Active and retired Catholic bishops of Taiwan
- President: Bishop John Lee Keh-Mien
- Main organ: Conference
- Parent organization: Catholic Church (Latin Church)
- Affiliations: Federation of Asian Bishops' Conferences
- Website: www.catholic.org.tw

Chinese Regional Bishops' Conference
- Traditional Chinese: 天主教會臺灣地區主教團
- Simplified Chinese: 天主敎会台湾地区主敎团
Transcriptions
Standard Mandarin
- Hanyu Pinyin: Tiānzhǔjiàohuì Táiwān Dìqū zhǔjiàotuán

The Chinese Regional Bishops' Conference (CRBC; Chinese: 天主教會臺灣地區主教團; lit. 'Catholic Bishops' Conference of the Taiwan Area') is the episcopal conference of Taiwan and is the highest organ of the Catholic Church in Greater China. Catholics in the independent jurisdictions of Hong Kong, Macau and Mongolia are represented in the Federation of Asian Bishops' Conferences, not the Chinese Regional Bishops' Conference.

== History ==
When Archbishop Paul Yü of Nanking attended the Second Vatican Council in 1965, Pope John XXIII proposed the development of the Chinese Catholic Church on Taiwan due to the situation of the Church on Mainland China. Part of this development would be to re-establish Catholic schools such as the Catholic University in Peking on Taiwan as well as creating a Chinese episcopal conference. Therefore, the Chinese Catholic Bishops Conference (天主教中國主教團) was established in 1967 and would serve as the national bishops' conference for all territories claimed by the Government of the Republic of China. In 1973, bishops from Taiwan, Hong Kong, Macao, Japan, Korea, Vietnam, and the Philippines gathered at Fu Jen Catholic University for the inaugural meeting of the Federation of Asian Bishops' Conferences.

In 1998, the conference adopted its current name to reflect the geopolitical situation and remains the only Chinese episcopal conference sanctioned by the Vatican. 20 years later, the Holy See's Secretariat of State requested that the conference change its English name to the Taiwan Region Catholic Bishops Conference as part of the détente between the Holy See and the Chinese Communist Party.

== Organizational structure ==
The conference is led by a president, vice president, and secretary-general. The Secretariat, the highest administrative unit, contains the following 10 commissions:

- Aborigine Apostolate
- Clergy
  - Subcommittee on Ongoing Priest Formation
  - Subcommittee on Seminaries Education
- Doctrine of the Faith and Catechetical Instruction
  - Sub-Commission of Bible Apostolate
    - Chinese Catholic Federation for the Bible Apostolate
  - Subcommittee on Catechesis Research
  - Subcommittee on Theology Research
  - Catholic Charismatic Renewal Service Team
- Education and Culture
- Evangelization
  - Subcommittee on Family
  - Subcommittee on Laity
  - Subcommittee on Youth
- Interreligious Dialogue and Ecumenical Cooperation
  - Promoting Christian Unity
- Pastoral Care of Migrants and Itinerant People
- Pastoral - Health Care
- Sacred Liturgy
- Social Development (Justice & Peace)

== Membership List ==
President: Most Reverend John Lee Keh-Mien (李克勉), Bishop of Hsinchu
Vice President: Most Reverend Peter Liu (劉振忠), Bishop of Kaohsiung

- Most Reverend Thomas Chung An-zu (鍾安住), Archbishop of Taipei
- Most Reverend Philip Huang (黃兆明), Bishop of Hualien
- Most Reverend Norbert Pu Ying-hsiung (浦英雄), Bishop of Chiayi
- Most Reverend Martin Su Yao-wen (蘇耀文), Bishop of Taichung
- Most Reverend John Hung, S.V.D. (洪山川), Archbishop Emeritus of Taipei
- Most Reverend Luke Liu (劉獻堂), Bishop Emeritus of Hsinchu
- Most Reverend James Liu (劉丹桂), Bishop Emeritus of Hsinchu
- Most Reverend Bosco Lin Chi-nan (林吉男), Bishop Emeritus of Tainan
- Most Reverend John Lee Juo-wang (李若望), Bishop Emeritus of Tainan
- Most Reverend John Baptist Tseng (曾建次), Auxiliary Bishop Emeritus of Hualien

Note: The Archbishop of Taipei has also overseen the Apostolic Administration of Kinma since 1968.

== See also ==
- Republic of China - Holy See relations
- Roman Catholicism in China
- Roman Catholicism in Taiwan
- Christianity in China
