= St. John's Church, Hsinchu =

St. John Church
- St. John Catholic Church
- 聖若望天主堂
- Location within Taiwan
- 24.7989°N 120.9316°E
- Location: No.212 Yanping Road, North, Hsinchu City, Taiwan
- Denomination: Roman Catholic Church

History
- Founded: 27 October 1957
- Founder: Fr. Linocoln

Architecture
- Functional status: Active

Administration
- Archdiocese: Archdiocese of Taipei
- Diocese: Diocese of Hsinchu
- Parish: Church of St. John

Clergy
- Archbishop: Archbishop John Hung Shan-chuan
- Bishop: Bishop John Baptist Lee Keh-mien. tw

The Church of St. John is a parish of the Roman Catholic Church located in North District, Hsinchu City, Taiwan. Part of the Diocese of Hsinchu, it is administered by the Congregation of the Holy Spirit (Spiritans), and under the pastoral responsibility of Bishop John Baptist Lee Keh-mien.

The current parish church opened for religious services in October 1957 with a capacity of 150 people.

== History ==
The first church was built in 1955 and originally dedicated to Saint Peter. It covered an area of only 1068 square feet., and so could only accommodate 30 people. For this reason, in 1957 Father Cai Weixian expanded the grounds to establish a new church. The new church was completed on October 27, and rededicated to Saint John. In November 2005, Father Victor Silva was the parish priest of St. John's Church, along with Jeanne d'Arc Church and Holy Rosary Church. Both congregations faced concern that over 80% in attendance at Sunday Mass were senior citizens.
