= Joseph Wang Yu-jung =

Taiwanese Roman Catholic bishop

- Bishop of Taichung
- Native name: 王愈榮
- Church: Catholic Church
- Diocese: Diocese of Taichung
- In office: 25 June 1986 – 25 June 2007
- Predecessor: William Francis Kupfer
- Successor: Martin Su Yao-wen
- Previous posts: Titular Bishop of Árd Sratha (1975-1986); Auxiliary Bishop of Taipei (1975-1986)

Orders
- Ordination: 24 December 1955 by Paul Yu Pin
- Consecration: 22 July 1975 by Agnelo Rossi

Personal details
- Born: 27 April 1931 Shanghai, Shanghai County, Jiangsu, Republic of China
- Died: 18 January 2018 (aged 86) Taichung, Republic of China

Joseph Wang Yu-jung (Chinese: 王愈榮; pinyin: Wáng Yùróng; 27 April 1931 – 18 January 2018) was a Roman Catholic bishop.

Ordained to the priesthood in 1955, Wang Yu-jung served as auxiliary bishop for the Roman Catholic Archdiocese of Taipei, Taiwan, from 1975 to 1986. He then served as bishop of the Diocese of Taichung from 1986 to 2007.

Joseph Wang served as the chairman of Fu Jen Catholic University from 2008 to 2009.
