= North District, Hsinchu =

District in Hsinchu City, Taiwan

Coordinates: 24.828027°N 120.947601°E

North 北區
- District
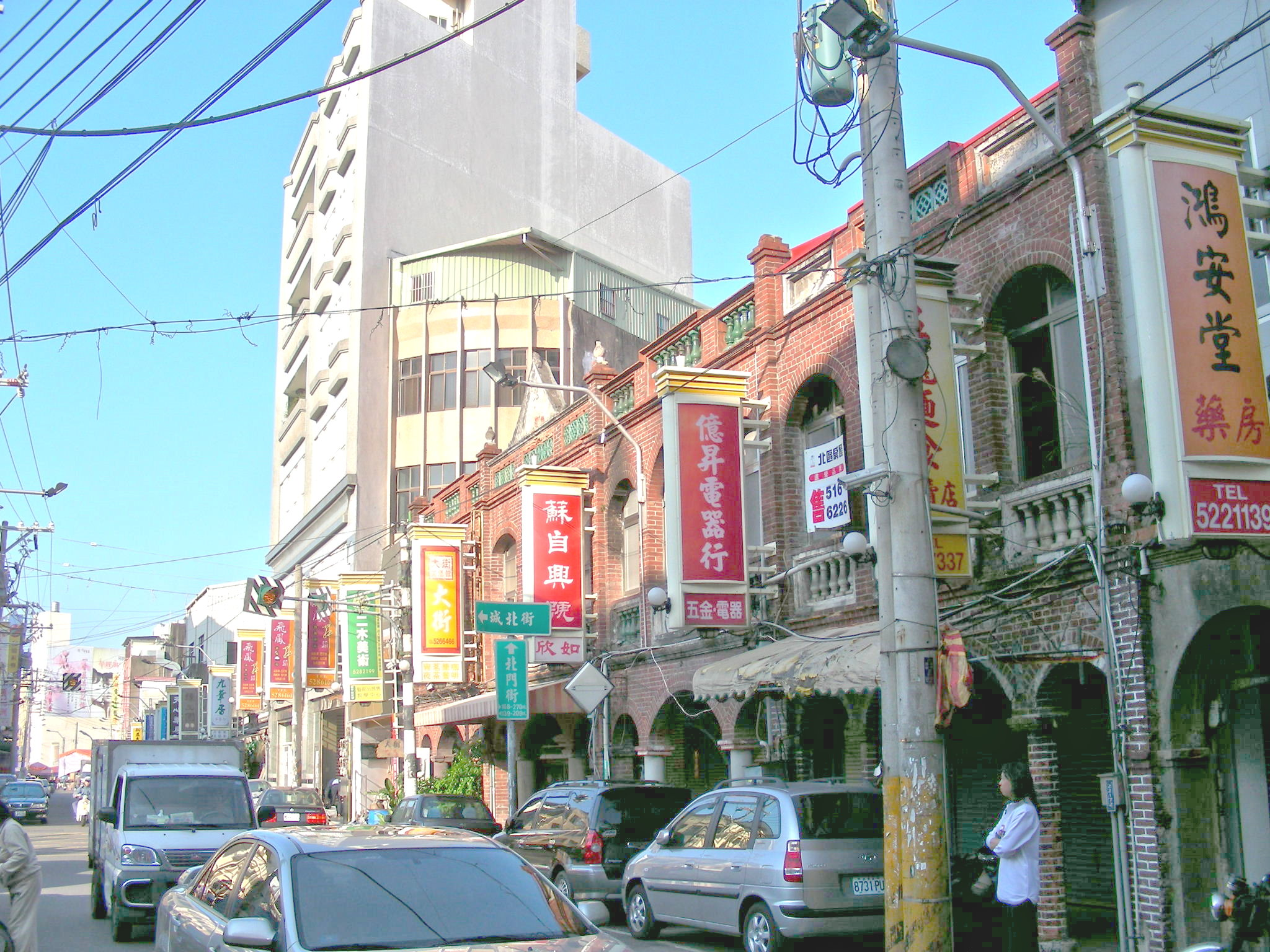

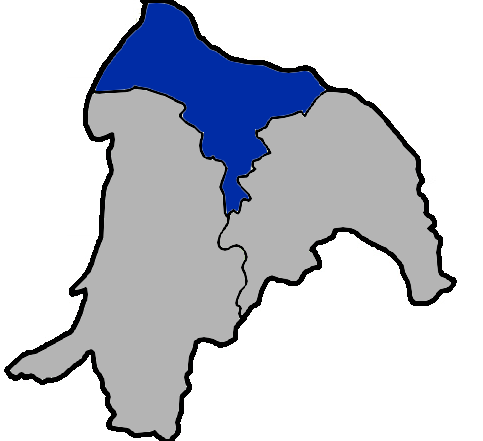
- North District in Hsinchu City
- Location: Hsinchu City, Taiwan

Government
  - Type: District government
  - Commissioner: Li Wu-xi

Area
  - Total: 15.73 km^{2} (6.07 sq mi)

Population (September 2023)
  - Total: 153,567
- Website: dep-n-district.hccg.gov.tw/en

North District (traditional Chinese: 北區; simplified Chinese: 北区; pinyin: Běi Qū) is a district in north Hsinchu City, Taiwan. North District is the city seat of Hsinchu City. It is the smallest of the three districts in Hsinchu City.

== Geography ==
- Area: 15.73 km^{2} (6.07 sq mi)
- Population: 153,567 (September 2023)

== Administrative divisions ==
The district consists of Ximen, Rende, Qianyuan, Zhongyang, Chongli, Shifang, Xingnan, Beimen, Zhongxing, Datong, Zhongshan, Zhanghe, Xinmin, Minfu, Shuitian, Wenya, Guangtian, Shilin, Fulin, Guxian, Nanya, Jiushe, Wuling, Nanliao, Jiugang, Kangle, Gangbei, Zhongliao, Haibin, Keya, Yuying, Quxi, Xiya, Nanshi, Dapeng, Jingfu, Panshi, Xinya, Guanghua, Jinhua, Jinzhu, Nanzhong, Jinya, Taixi and Zhongya Village.

== Government institutions ==
- Hsinchu Air Base
- Hsinchu City Government
- Hsinchu City Council

== Infrastructures ==
- Hsinchu City EPB Incinerator Plant

== Tourist attractions ==
- Hsinchu Baseball Stadium
- Hsinchu City Fire Museum
- Hsinchu Chenghuang Temple
- Hsinchu Fish Harbor
- Hsinchu Museum of Military Dependents Village
- Hsinchu Performing Arts Center
- Immaculate Heart of Mary Cathedral
- St. John Church
