= Asian Youth Day =

International Catholic event held every three years

Asian Youth Day (AYD) is an international Catholic event organized by the Federation of Asian Bishops' Conferences, Office of Laity & Family, Youth Desk and the host country. The event, which is held every three years, brings together Catholic youths from all over Asia. The event is similar to World Youth Day.

The week long gathering enables Asian youth to experience the Gospel with others of different cultures and how the modern world celebrates the Gospel, and how it applies to current issues like social justice, leadership among its youth. The week festivities include prayer, forums, and workshops. The event is used to enrich, inspire, and renew the spiritual lives of Catholic youth of Asia.

== History ==
In 1991, during the fifth World Youth Day in Częstochowa, Poland, delegates from numerous Asian countries expressed their desire to create a network and various channels of their own, to inspire the Catholic youth on the Asian continent.

In 1993, a youth consultation conference was held in Bangkok, Thailand. Participating youth representatives at the conference suggested that a youth working group be formed as a parish-based subsidiary of the Federation of Asian Bishops’ Conferences in an effort to gather support for youth leaders within the organization and to enhance mutual cooperation and links among youth parish groups from Asian countries.

The Youth Desk was officially established in 1994. Since its opening, the team has successfully organized a series of activities for Asian youths and youth leaders, including the Asian Youth Gathering during the World Youth Day, Asian Youth Ministers’ Meeting and Asian Youth Day.

Asian Youth Day Host Countries
| Order | Year | Date | City | Nation | Theme | Notes |
|---|---|---|---|---|---|---|
| 1st | 1999 | August 7 – August 12 | Hua Hin | Thailand | Asian Youth journeying with Jesus towards the New Millennium | |
| 2nd | 2001 | August 11 – August 17 | Taipei | Taiwan | We are called to Sanctity and Solidarity | |
| 3rd | 2003 | August 10 – August 17 | Bangalore | India | Asian Youth for Peace | |
| 4th | 2006 | July 30 – August 5 | Hong Kong | China | Youth, Hope of Asian Families | |
| 5th | 2009 | November 20 – November 27 | Imus | Philippines | YAsia, Fiesta! Young Asians: Come Together, Share the Word, Live the Eucharist | |
| 6th | 2014 | August 10 – August 17 | Daejeon | South Korea | Asian Youth! Wake up! The Glory of the Martyrs Shines on You! | Attended by Pope Francis. |
| 7th | 2017 | July 30 – August 6 | Yogyakarta | Indonesia | Joyful Asian Youth: Living the Gospel in Multicultural Asia! | |
| 8th | 2021 | October | | India | | |

== See also ==
- World Youth Day
- Catholic spirituality
- Catholic youth work
- Eucharistic Congress
- Fellowship of Catholic University Students
- International Federation of Catholic Parochial Youth Movements (Fimcap)
- International Youth Day
- International Youth Year
- Life Teen
- Universal call to holiness
- Vocational Discernment in the Catholic Church
- Youth 2000
