= Xinzhu =

Xinzhu may refer to:

- Xinzhu station, a metro station of the Xi'an Metro
- Xinzhu Subdistrict (新竹街道), Qingxiu, Nanning, Guangxi Zhuang Autonomous Region, China
- Xinzhu City (新竹市), Taiwan
- Xinzhu County (新竹县), Taiwan
- Feng Xinzhu (born 1960), Chinese politician

== See also ==
- Hsinchu (disambiguation)
- 新竹 (disambiguation)
