= Hsinchu Airport =

Airport in North, Hsinchu City, Taiwan

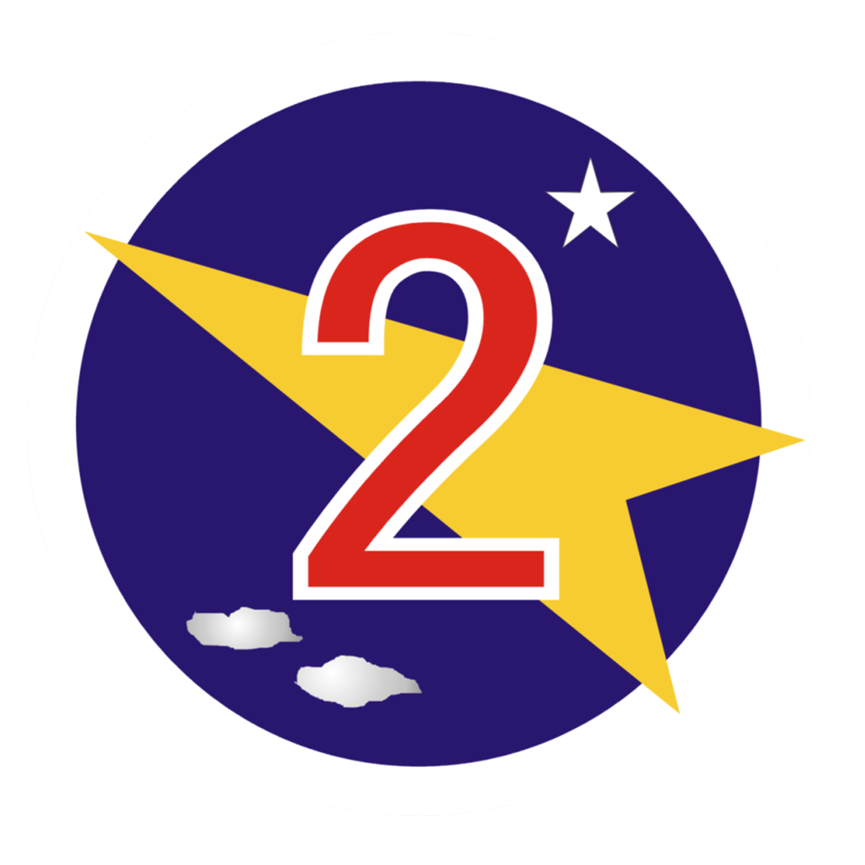
Hsinchu Air Base
- 新竹空軍基地
- Located in North, Hsinchu, Republic of China (Taiwan)
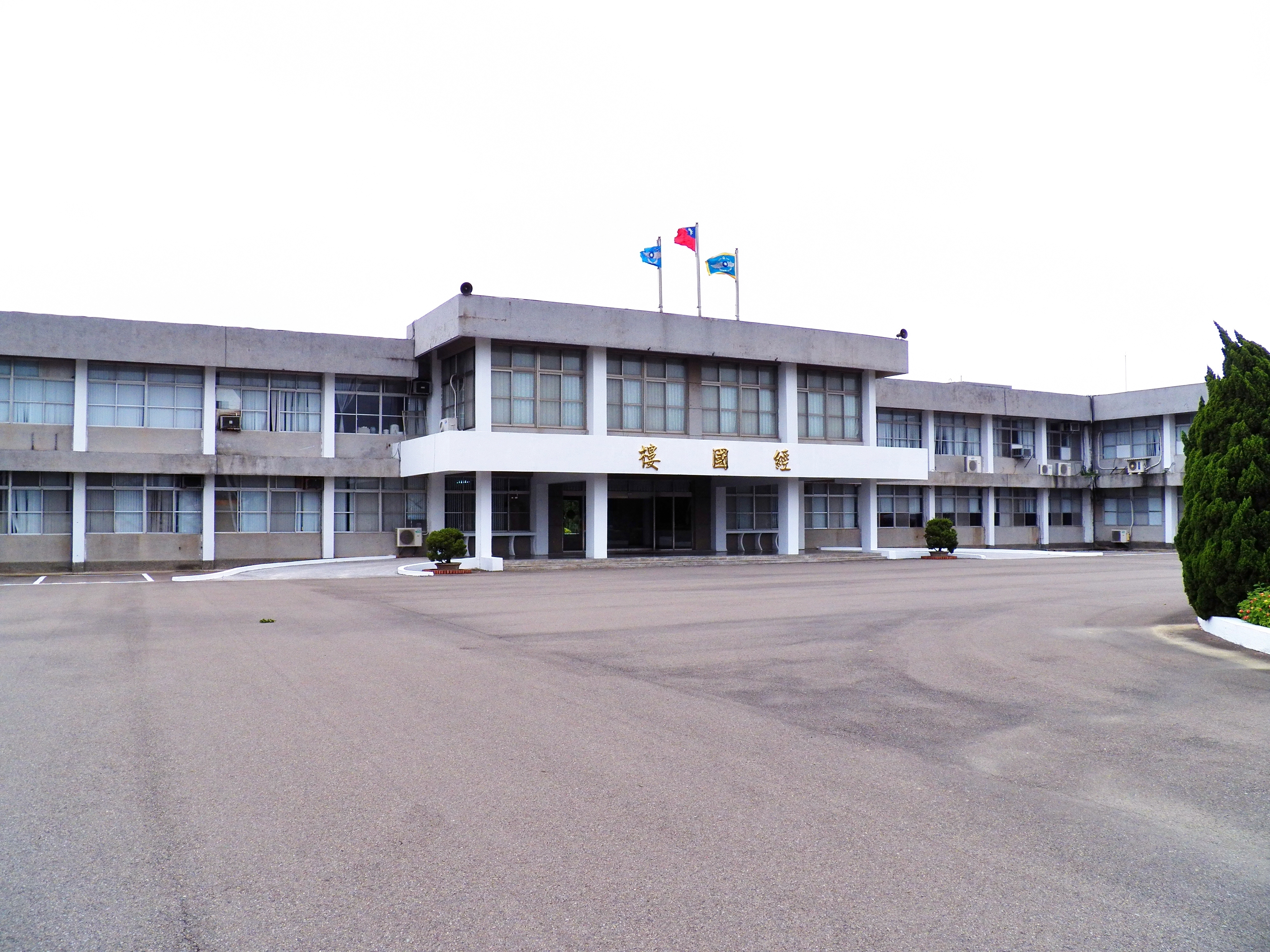

Site information
- Type: Military air base
- Owner: (Taiwan) Air Force Command Headquarters
- Controlled by: Imperial Japanese Navy Air Service (1936–1945); Republic of China Air Force (1946–present); United States Air Force (1950–1979)

Location
- Coordinates: 24°49′05″N 120°56′21″E

Site history
- In use: 19 May 1936–present

Airfield information
- Identifiers: IATA: HSZ, ICAO: RCPO
- Elevation: 26m (85ft) AMSL
Runways
Direction	Length and surface
05/23	3,644 metres (11,955 ft) concrete/asphalt

Hsinchu Airport (traditional Chinese: 新竹機場; simplified Chinese: 新竹机场; pinyin: Xīnzhú Jīchǎng, IATA: HSZ, ICAO: RCPO) is an airport and military airbase in North District, Hsinchu City, Taiwan.

== History ==
It was constructed during the era of Japanese rule on 19 May 1936 and was named Shinchiku Airdrome (Japanese: 新竹飛行場).

On November 25, 1943, during the Pacific War, an air raid was carried out by a joint force of the United States Army Air Forces and the National Revolutionary Army against the military base. The surprise attack by the Allied forces was successful, and the Japanese military lost a large number of aircraft.

As of the late 1990s, the longest runway at Hsinchu was reportedly 12,000 feet (3658 m) long.

Stationed at Hsinchu AB:

- 499th Tactical Fighter Wing
- 41 Sqn (Mirage 2000-5)
- 42 Sqn (Mirage 2000–5)
- 48 Sqn (Mirage 2000–5).

== Accidents and incidents ==
In July 2020, a Bell OH-58 Kiowa helicopter crashed at Hsinchu Air Force base, killing the two pilots.

== See also ==
- Republic of China Air Force
