= Hsinchu City Performance Hall =

Art center in North, Hsinchu City, Taiwan

- 風城演藝
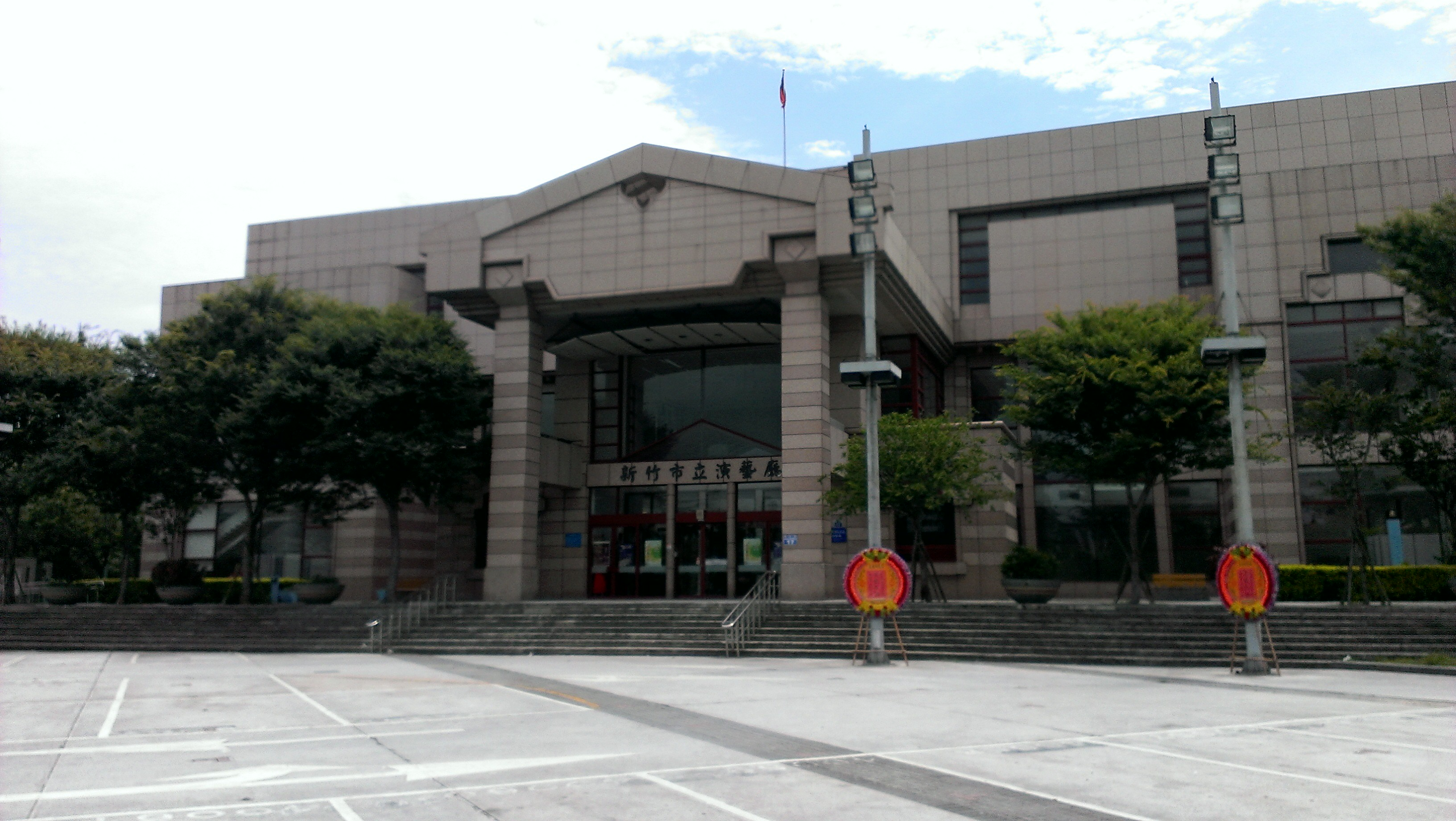
- Interactive map of Hsinchu City Performance Hall
- Location: North, Hsinchu City, Taiwan
- Coordinates: 24°48′41.0″N 120°58′05.0″E
- Type: theatre
- Public transit: Hsinchu Station

The Hsinchu City Performance Hall (traditional Chinese: 風城演藝; simplified Chinese: 风城演艺; pinyin: Fēngchéng Yǎnyì) is an art center in North District, Hsinchu City, Taiwan.

== History ==
The center was originally established as the Hsinchu City Performance Hall. It was then placed under the Performing Arts Section of the Bureau of Cultural Affairs of Hsinchu City Government since 1 July 2004.

== Notable events ==
- 48th Golden Horse Awards

== Transportation ==
The center is accessible within walking distance north of Hsinchu Station of Taiwan Railway.

== See also ==
- List of tourist attractions in Taiwan
