= Hsinchu Museum of Military Dependents Village =

Museum in North, Hsinchu City, Taiwan

Hsinchu City Military Village Museum
- 新竹市眷村博物館
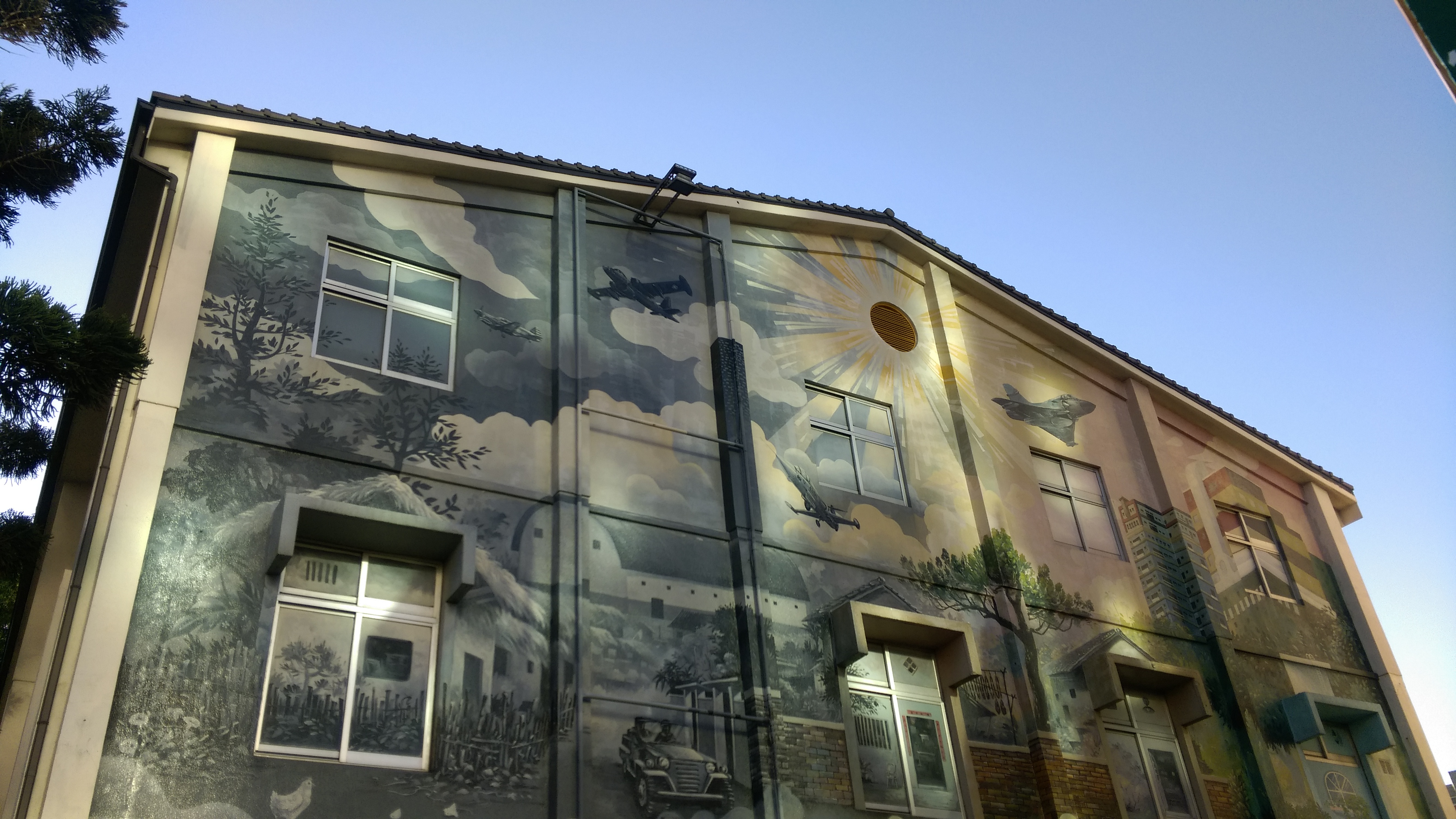
- Established: 28 December 2002
- Location: North, Hsinchu City, Taiwan
- Coordinates: 24°48′51″N 120°58′01″E
- Type: museum
- Public transit access: Hsinchu Station

The Hsinchu City Military Village Museum (traditional Chinese: 新竹市眷村博物館; simplified Chinese: 新竹市眷村博物馆; pinyin: Xīnzhúshì Juàncūn Bówùguǎn) is a museum about the military dependents' village in North District, Hsinchu City, Taiwan.

== History ==
The museum was established by the Cultural Affairs Bureau of Hsinchu City Government on 28 December 2002.

After the civil war between the Kuomintang (also known as the Chinese Nationalist Party) and the Communist Party in 1949, the Nationalist Government retreated to Taiwan. The military, civilian, and government personnel of all provinces were forced to move to settle in Taiwan. According to statistics, from 1945 to 1950, nearly 2 million soldiers and civilians from all parts of mainland China moved to Taiwan. In order to solve the housing problem caused by the population explosion, the Nationalist Government began to build houses or arrange dormitories, and the new residents were grouped in a certain range with the military service, occupation, and characteristics, which is now known as the “Military Dependents Village”.

== Architecture ==
In Hsinchu, there were initially 47 villages, and the proportion is quite high.

== Exhibitions ==
The museum houses historic relics and information regarding the buildings in the museum. The museum also regularly hold various exhibitions.

== Transportation ==
The museum is accessible within walking distance north from Hsinchu Station of Taiwan Railway.

== See also ==
- List of museums in Taiwan
