= ASTAC =

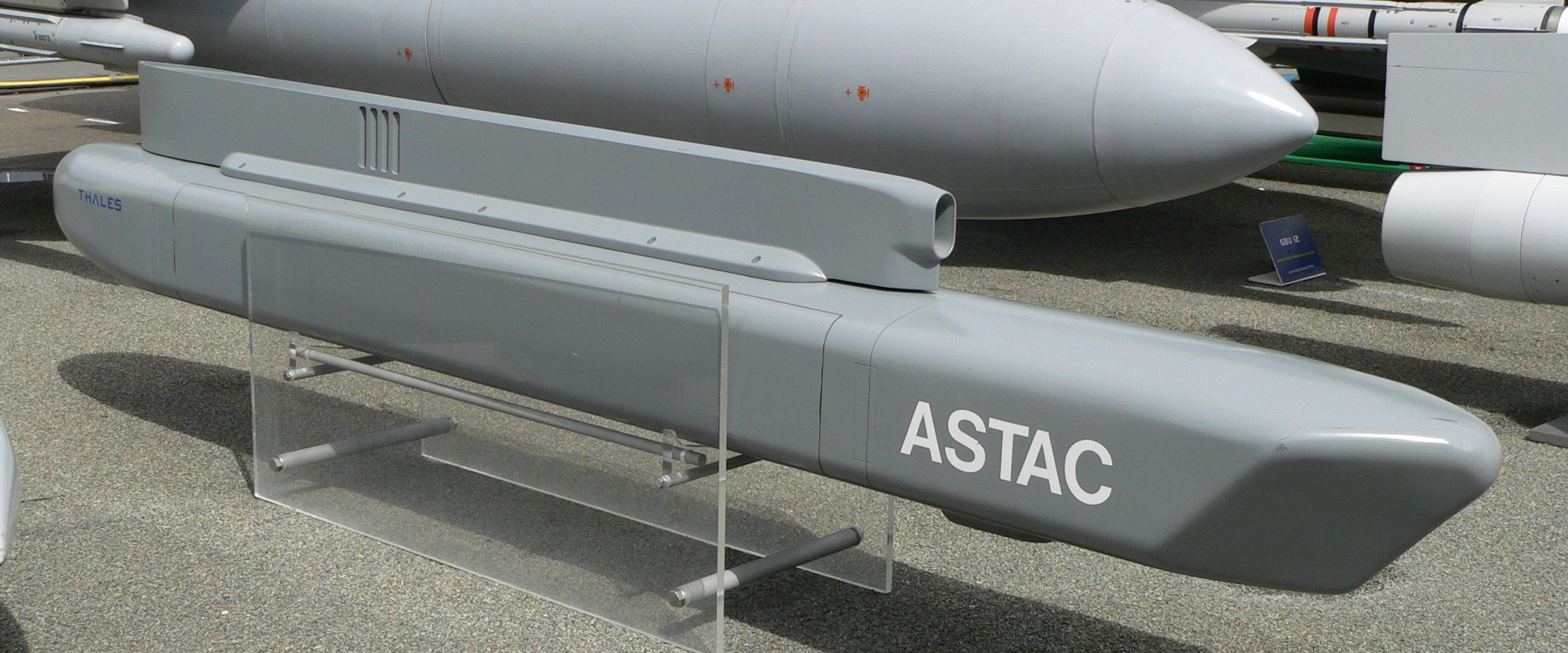
ASTAC

ASTAC (French: Analyseur de signaux tactiques) is a B band to K band (NATO) SIGINT aircraft pod made by Thales Group. It is a reconnaissance system used to intercept and analyse tactical and technical data on Radio frequency emissions radiated by land-based radars and weapon systems. Recording capabilities and datalinks for real-time interfaces with ground stations are available as options. In operation under F-4 Phantom, Mirage 2000-5, Mirage 2000D, Mirage F1. Two of them also equip the two Transall C-160G Gabriel, one at each wingtip. It has been fitted under F-16 for NATO trials. The different generations of ASTAC are operated by more than ten air forces worldwide.
