= Lucas Liu Hsien-tang =

Taiwanese Roman Catholic bishop (born 1928)

The Most Reverend Lucas Liu Hsien-tang
- Bishop Emeritus of Hsinchu
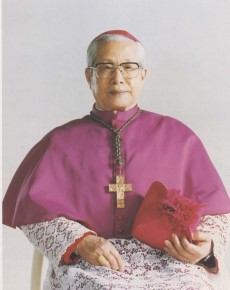
- Native name: 劉獻堂
- Church: Catholic Church
- Diocese: Hsinchu
- Appointed: 29 June 1983
- Term ended: 4 December 2004
- Predecessor: Peter Pao-Zin Tou
- Successor: James Liu Tan-kuei

Orders
- Ordination: 30 November 1956
- Consecration: 1 January 1981

Personal details
- Born: 21 December 1928 (age 97) Tung Shung Tan, Xian (now Hebei, China)

Lucas Liu Hsien-tang (Chinese: 劉獻堂; born 21 December 1928) is a Taiwanese prelate of the Catholic Church who served as the Bishop of the Diocese of Hsinchu in Taiwan from 1983 to 2004.

== Biography ==
Lucas Liu was born on 21 December 1928 in Tung Shung Tan, Xian (present-day Hebei Province, China). He was ordained a priest on 30 November 1956.

On 24 October 1980, Liu was appointed Coadjutor Bishop of Hsinchu, and he received episcopal consecration on 1 January 1981, with Bishop Peter Tou Pao-Zin as principal consecrator. He succeeded Bishop Tou as Bishop of Hsinchu on 29 June 1983.

Liu led the Catholic community of Hsinchu, a diocese in northwestern Taiwan that is part of the ecclesiastical province of Roman Catholic Archdiocese of Taipei. On 4 December 2004, his resignation was accepted by Pope John Paul II upon reaching the customary retirement age for bishops, making him Bishop Emeritus of Hsinchu.

== Legacy ==
During his tenure, Liu participated in episcopal ministry in Taiwan and co-consecrated John Baptist Lee Keh-mien, later Bishop of Hsinchu.
