= 新竹 =

新竹, meaning 'new bamboo', may refer to:

- Hsinchu, a city located in northwestern Taiwan
- Shinchiku, one of the administrative divisions of Taiwan during the Japanese era
- Shintake, a Japanese surname name

== See also ==
- Hsinchu (disambiguation)
- Xinzhu (disambiguation)
