= Hsinchu Fish Harbor =

Fishing port in North, Hsinchu City, Taiwan

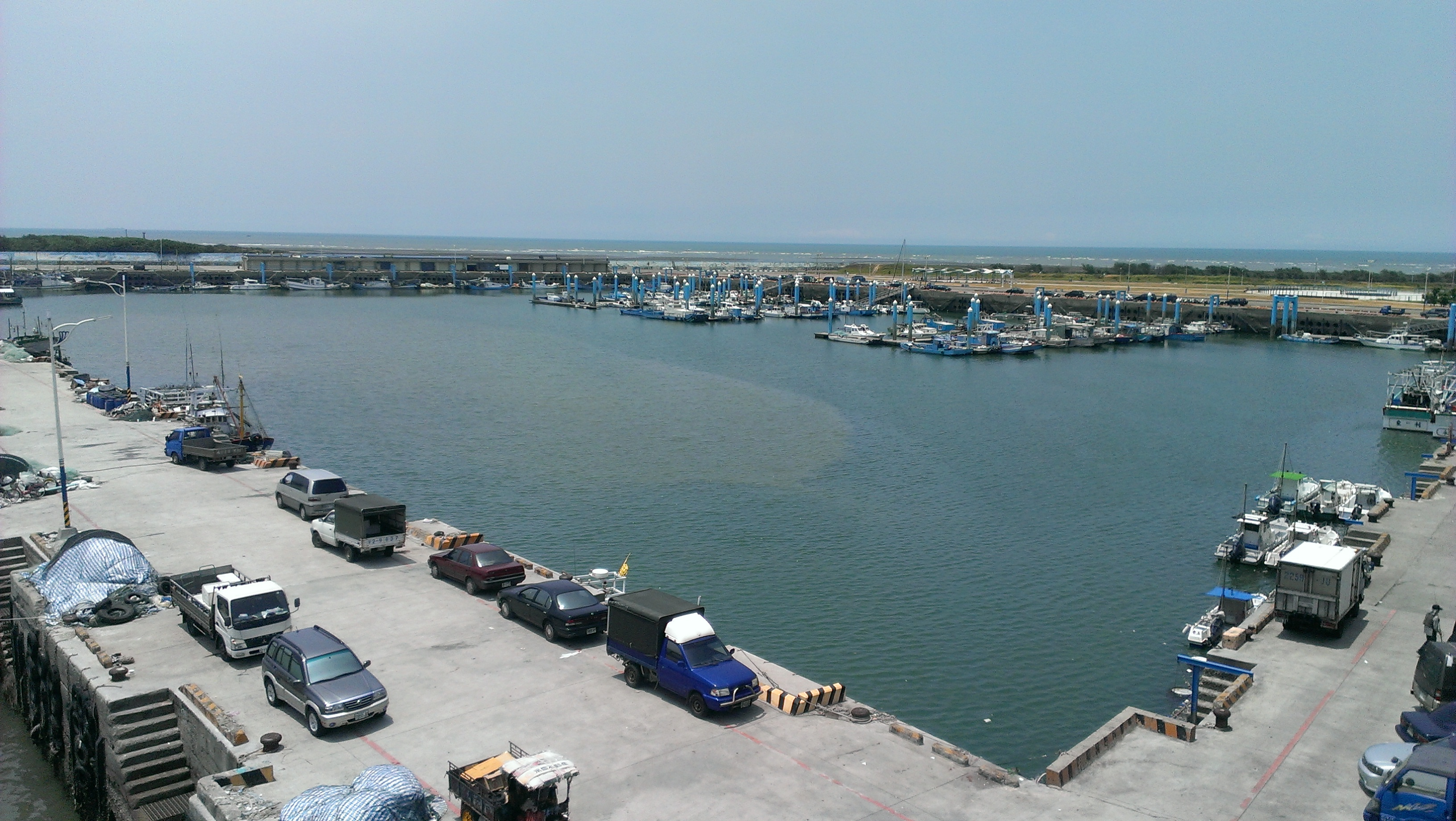
- Interactive map of Hsinchu Fish Harbor
- Location within Taiwan
- Native name: 新竹漁港

Location
- Location: North, Hsinchu City, Taiwan
- Coordinates: 24°50′58.2″N 120°55′43.7″E

Details
- Opened: 1988
- Type of Harbor: fishing port

The Hsinchu Fish Harbor (traditional Chinese: 新竹漁港; simplified Chinese: 新竹渔港; pinyin: Xīnzhú Yúgǎng) or Nanliao Harbor (traditional Chinese: 南寮漁港; simplified Chinese: 南寮渔港; pinyin: Nánliáo Yúgǎng) is a fishing port in North District, Hsinchu City, Taiwan.

== History ==
The harbor was originally built in the 1980s for the convenience of local fishermen. However, due to the decreasing amount of fish over the years, the old harbor was replaced by new, tourism-focused buildings.

== Activities ==
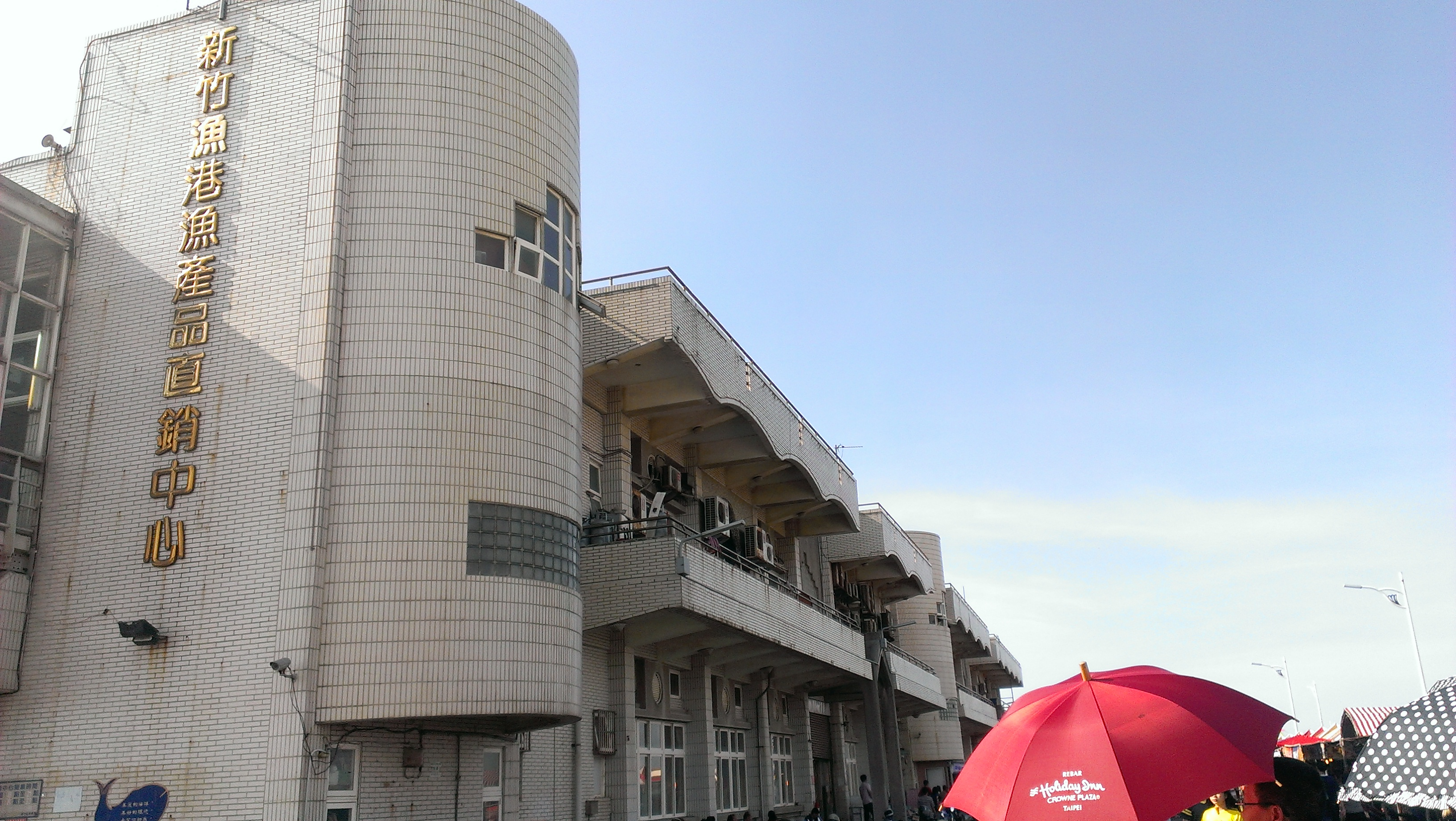
Hsinchu Seafood Wholesale Center

The harbor acts as the center for the local seafood business. It has housed the Hsinchu Fishermen's Association since 1991, which has since become an important location for residents to buy seafood. Trading done in the Hsinchu Seafood Wholesale Center, a two-story building, in which the ground level houses seafood trading activities and the upper level houses a food market.

Activities that can be done around the harbor area include cycling, kite flying and eating seafood.

== Transportation ==
The harbor is accessible in the north west from Hsinchu Station of Taiwan Railway.

== See also ==
- Hsinchu
