= Diocese of Taichung =

Roman Catholic diocese in Taiwan

Coordinates: 24.1427°N 120.6800°E

Diocese of Taichung Dioecesis Taichungensis 天主教台中教區
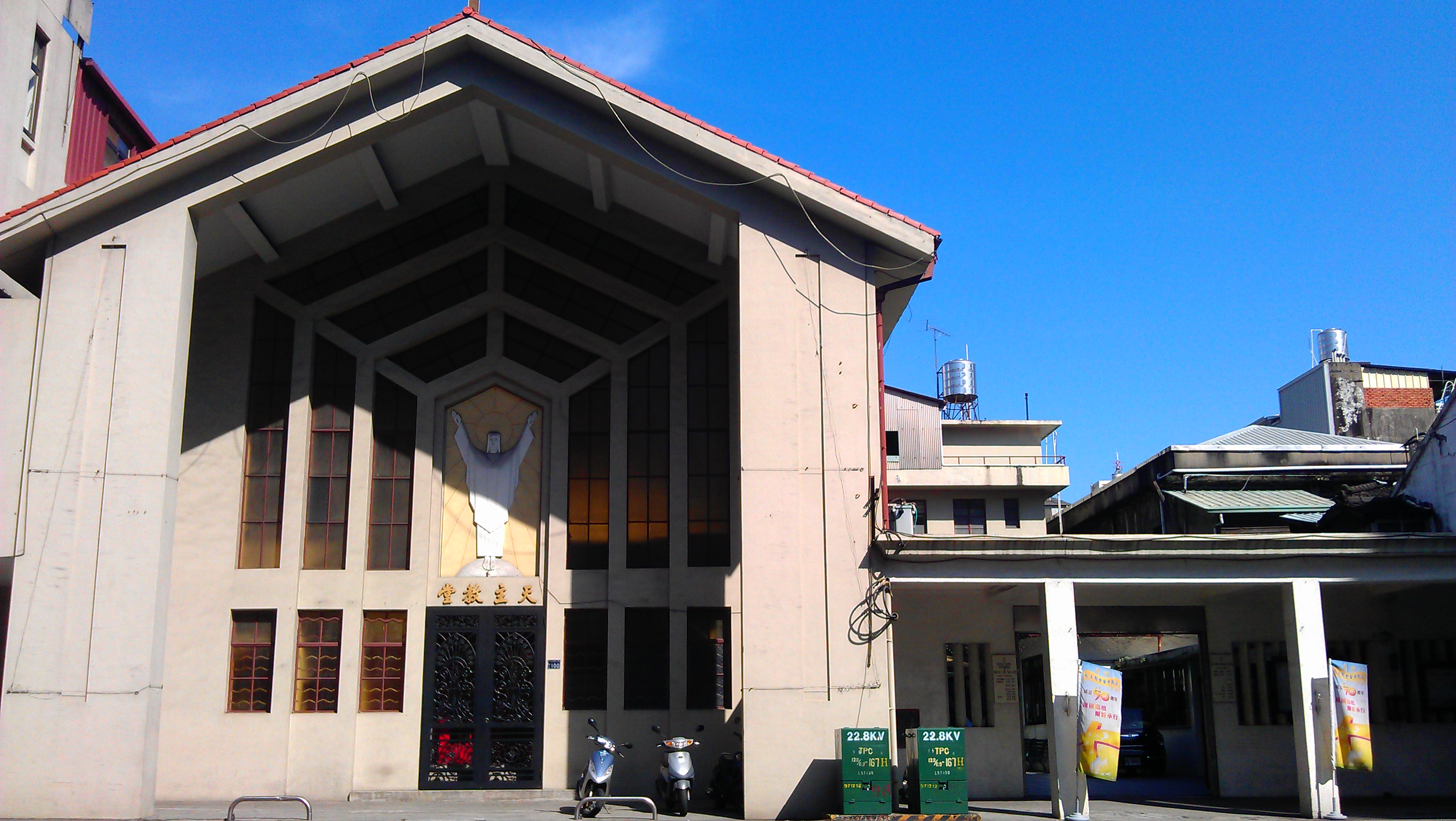
- Cathedral of Jesus Saviour

Location
- Country: Taiwan
- Territory: Taichung and counties of Changhua and Nantou
- Ecclesiastical province: Taipei
- Archdeaconries: 5

Statistics
- Area: 7,836 km^{2} (3,025 sq mi)
- Population: Total; Catholics: (as of 2010); 4,235,174; 26,395 (0.6%)
- Parishes: 36
- Members: 29,012

Information
- Denomination: Roman Catholic
- Sui iuris church: Latin Church
- Rite: Roman Rite
- Cathedral: Cathedral of Jesus Saviour in Taichung
- Patron saint: Christ the Saviour

Current leadership
- Pope: Leo XIV
- Bishop: Martin Su Yao-wen
- Metropolitan Archbishop: Thomas Chung An-zu
- Vicar General: Joseph Huang Ching-fu; Peter Chou Lai-shun (Walis Nomin)
- Bishops emeritus: Joseph Wang Yu-jung Bishop Emeritus (1986-2007)

Map
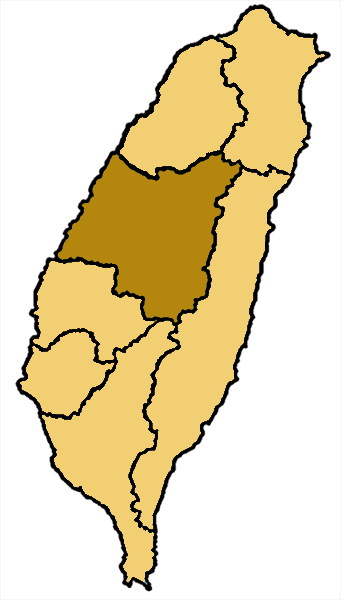

Website
- Website of the Diocese

The Diocese of Taichung (Latin: Dioecesis Taichungensis) is a Latin Church diocese of the Catholic Church in Taiwan.

Originally erected as an Apostolic Prefecture of Taichung in 1950, it was elevated to a full diocese in 1962. The diocese is a suffragan of the Archdiocese of Taipei.

The current bishop is Martin Su Yao-wen, appointed in June 2007.

== Ordinaries ==
- William Francis Kupfer, M.M. † (26 Jan 1951 Appointed – 25 Jun 1986 Retired)
- Joseph Wang Yu-jung † (25 Jun 1986 Appointed – 25 Jun 2007 Retired)
- Martin Su Yao-wen (25 Jun 2007 Appointed – present)

== See also ==
- Catholic Church in Taiwan
