= Youth 2000 =

Irish volunteer organisation

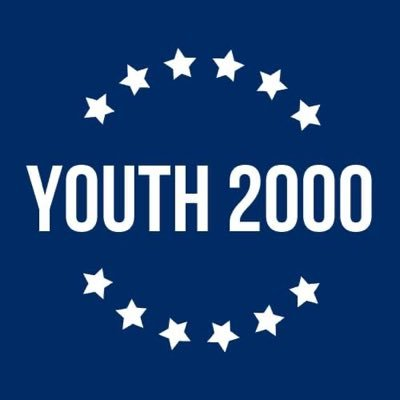
- Founded: 1990; 36 years ago
- Type: Catholic youth
- Location: International
- Website: youth2000.ie

Youth 2000 is an international Catholic movement for young people, generally between the ages of 16 and 35. Youth 2000's activities generally include the running of both community prayer groups and weekend retreats for young people. At their retreats, which are between two and five days long, teens and adults alike share their love for Jesus through the Eucharist, adoration, and praise and worship. It has been active since 1990 in the UK and in Ireland in 1993. The first weekly prayer group was held at the Carmelite Priory in Kensington.

== Beginnings ==
Youth2000 was started in response to Pope John Paul II's invitation to the youth to take an active part in the Decade of Evangelization leading up to the Great Jubilee Year 2000. In his address at World Youth Day in Santiago de Compostela in Spain in 1989, Pope John Paul II asked young people to evangelize each other by coming together, learning about and experiencing the love of God, saying: "It is up to you young people that the task first falls of bearing witness to the faith and bringing into the Third Millennium the Gospel of Christ, who is the Way, the Truth and the Life". Ernest Williams, a twenty-six-year old IT specialist from England, was moved by the challenge and came up with the idea of Youth 2000, formally founding the organization in Medjugorje in 1990.

== Purpose ==
Whilst specific details vary from country to country, the main focuses of Youth 2000 tend to be:

- Increasing the awareness and love of Jesus in the Eucharist, through Mass and Eucharistic Adoration.
- Promoting devotion to Mary as a means of coming closer to Christ, through saying the Rosary.
- Encouraging young people to read the Bible, get to know Jesus through Scripture and also to promote understanding of and fidelity to official Church teaching.
- Bringing about Christian conversion.

== The Structure of a Youth 2000 Retreat ==
Youth 2000's weekend retreats play a large role in their activities. The structure of retreats vary; summer retreats tend to be longer than autumn retreats. As a rule of thumb, retreats involve workshops, live music, adoration and Mass.

In the UK the main event is the annual Youth 2000 Prayer Festival, which takes place at the Walsingham Catholic Shrine in Norfolk over five days covering the August Bank Holiday weekend.

== Controversies ==
In 2006, members of a Youth 2000 Retreat organised by Fr Kevin Knox-Lecky, the Catholic Priest of St Mary's church, Glastonbury, were cautioned by police for throwing salt and shouting at local pagans. The police warned two women and arrested (and later released) one youth.

Fr Knox-Lecky said that the poor behaviour witnessed by the Pagan Community had come from a small, militant "fringe group" that "attached" itself to the Youth 2000 retreat in Glastonbury. He said this militant fringe group was “unChristian and unrepresentative” of Youth 2000.

Charlie Connor, the managing director of Youth 2000, said: "For the avoidance of doubt, Youth 2000 does not condone or encourage this kind of behaviour from anyone. We fully agree that differences on matters of faith cannot and should not be resolved by any kind of harassment."

But he added: "Youth 2000 would also like to place on the record that many young people at the retreat were harassed, sworn at and even cursed by people. One incident included the taking of photographs of young people, including children, and number plates by people present in the town."
