= Advanced Mirage 2000 interceptor variants =

Upgraded variants of the Dassault Mirage 2000

Mirage 2000-5
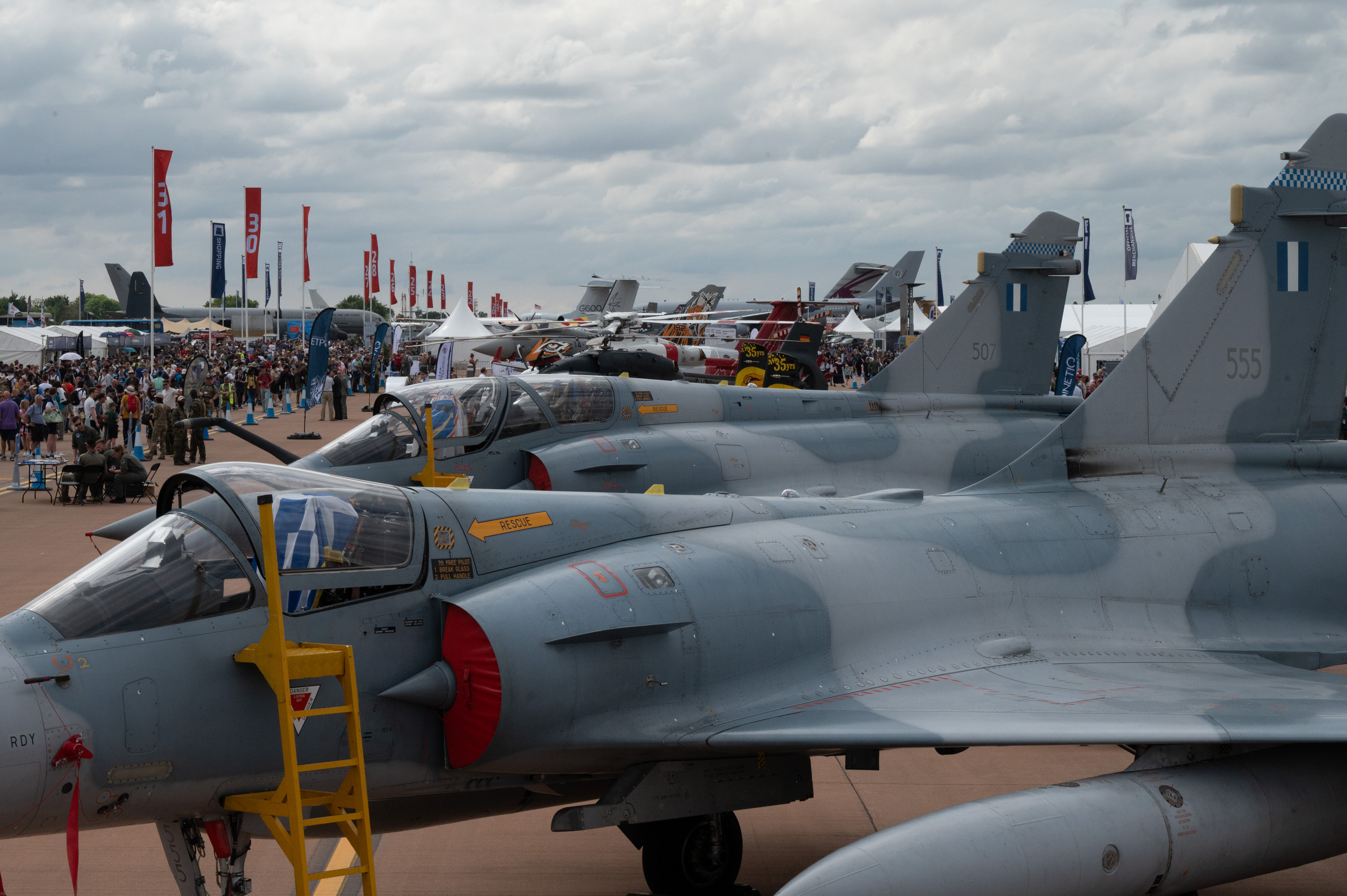

General information
- Manufacturer: Dassault Aviation
- Primary users: France Taiwan, Qatar, Greece, United Arab Emirates, Ukraine

History
- First flight: 24 October 1990
- In service: 1999–present
- Developed from: Mirage 2000C

The Dassault Mirage 2000-5 and its derivatives are the result of an initially private venture by Dassault Aviation, aimed at providing Mirage 2000 interceptor aircraft with improved capabilities. This new slew of upgrades was centred around the Thomson-CSF RDY radar, an upgraded human-machine interface, the integration of MICA missiles (radar and infrared) and the ICMS Mk.II self-defence system for the export variants.

== Development ==
In the latter half of the 1980s, Mirage 2000 foreign sales fell, having failed in multiple fighter procurement competitions; the airframe capabilities were deemed lacking compared to more modern American counterparts. By February 1989, the first F-16A–to–ADF (air defence fighter) conversion was completed, enabling the already versatile aircraft to carry a maximum of 6 BVR missiles (first AIM-7 Sparrows, then AIM-120s), upgrading the AN/APG-66 radar to allow look down/shoot down capabilities; enhanced smaller RCS target detection and the addition of CW (continuous wave) illuminator for the Sparrow missile. This was an improvement compared to the 2 BVR missiles that the Mirage 2000C could carry at the time. This development prompted Dassault, in April 1989, to announce a private venture, aimed to rival the ever-growing American presence in the low-cost fighter market: the Mirage 2000-5. It was decided that the foundation for this upgrade were to be the Thomson-CSF RDY radar, the Matra MICA air intercept missile and a cockpit modernized with technologies developed for the Rafale program. Each one of these elements was tested from 1988 onwards, and they all came together on 24 October 1990 when a Mirage 2000B flew as the first modernized 2000-5 variant. A single-seater flight followed on 27 April 1991, with the aircraft being a prototype conversion of CY1, wearing the tail number "01". The same aircraft would go on to continue its flight testing career, wearing tail numbers "02" and "'03", perhaps indicating progressive avionics upgrades.

Approval for production was given on 25 November 1993.

In July 1996, trials for the integration of the MICA EM active radar homing missile (then known only as MICA, since the MICA IR infrared missile would enter service later) were satisfactorily completed.

In December 1997, the UAE ordered 30 new Mirage 2000-9s along with upgrades for 33 existing aircraft. This variant, tailored to the UAE's needs, introduced true multi-role capability thanks to the RDY-2 radar, advanced strike options, and the ICMS Mk.II electronic warfare suite. The US$3.4 billion deal was finalized in 1998, with the Black Shaheen missile chosen as its primary long-range weapon. Around the same period, Greece expanded its Mirage fleet: in 1999 it integrated the Exocet for maritime strike, and in 2000 signed for 15 new Mirage 2000-5 Mk.II and 10 upgrades, though deliveries were delayed by issues with the ICMS Mk.III system.

=== RDY radar ===
Development of the RDY radar had started earlier, in 1984. The aim was to create a multi-mode, look down/shoot-down fire control radar that could operate in the X band (NATO I band) and provide multi-targeting capabilities. It is equipped with a mechanically steered slotted-plane array, with the advantages of very good ground clutter rejection and very small secondary lobes. It can ideally track up to 24 different targets, with a maximum of 8 contacts being able to be tracked in TWS (track-while-scan) mode. It was first tested in June 1987 aboard a Dassault Mystère 20, and underwent testing for its ground mapping modes on the southwest of the Centre d'essais en vol in 1989/1990 and in Mirage 2000s 04 and X7. The initial RDY variant was employed solely as an air intercept radar, lacking any air to ground ranging mode. It retained the ground mapping modes from RDI, since these were only used for navigation and not actual ground ordnance employment.

Performance for the original RDY variant was estimated to fall a bit short of the AN/APG-66V2: around 83 km (45 nmi; 52 mi) for the former, compared to 85 km (46 nmi; 53 mi) for the latter. These ranges were calculated on an 85% detection probability against a target with a 5 m^{2} (7800 in^{2}) radar cross-section. RDY's air-to-air performance can be attributed to the permanently optimized use, and selectable automatic control of three basic waveforms: high, medium and low pulse-repetition frequencies (HFR, MFR and BFR):

- Very-long-range detection (80-nautical-mile class (150 km; 92 mi)) is achieved through the use of search-speed waveform (HRF-RV).
- Long-range detection (65-nautical-mile class (120 km; 75 mi)), including very low flying targets (less than 500 ft (150 m)), is achieved through the range search waveform (HFR-RD).
- Medium-range detection (40-nautical-mile class (74 km; 46 mi)) is achieved through MFR waveform, including very low altitude (TBA).

Considering the detection ranges and the MICA missile flight envelope, these engagements are generally long range.

Later RDY variants (RDY-2 and RDY-3) were developed for export and never used in French service. RDY-2, for example, offered a 15% increase in detection range for fighter-sized contacts, a synthetic-aperture radar mapping mode, air-to-sea functions and a terrain-following mode.

=== Cockpit and ergonomics ===
The origins of the Mirage 2000-5s cockpit design philosophy can be traced as far back as 4 July 1986, when the Rafale A flight demonstrator took off for the first time. This innovative aircraft contained the first iteration of what would become the VTM (viseur tête moyenne), a head-level display collimated to infinity that would allow the pilot to switch from BVR (beyond visual range) to WVR (within visual range) combat without the need to refocus their eyesight. Following the footsteps of American competition in the early to mid-1990s the Mirage 2000-5 was equipped with three multi-function displays: two VTLs (viseur tête latérale) fmounted at each side of the front panel, and a VTB (viseur tête basse) positioned where the original Mirage 2000C VTB used to sit. The "Dash 5" designation refers to these four screens, plus the VTH (viseur tête haute), the French term for the HUD. The overarching cockpit philosophy emphasizes reducing pilot workload through fully integrated HOTAS controls, a refined human–machine interface (HMI), and VTL-based digital menu structures, replacing the majority of conventional analogue gauges with multifunction display-driven data management.

Starting from the front panel, the VTH has a 15° × 20° field of view, and in its various modes it projects missile ranging information, aircraft status information (speed, heading and altitude) and navigation information, allowing the pilot to metaphorically keep their head out of the cockpit and increase situational awareness.

Going down further, the VTM's only purpose is to display the radar scope directly in front of the pilot and with infinite collimation, to allow an easier transition from BVR to WVR combat, without the need to refocus the eyes. Through HOTAS commands it's possible to change radar parameters such as number of scan lines, azimuth scan, antenna elevation and radar modes (ground mapping, terrain avoidance, etc.).

The VTLs are two coloured LCD displays, mounted on each side of the front panel. They replace the vast majority of analogue gauges and dials from the Mirage 2000C, displaying information about attack systems, navigation points and countermeasures. Due to the deletion of the radar warning receiver panel from the aircraft, threat warning and electronic warfare information are also displayed on a VTL page.

Finally, the VTB is used as a TACSIT (tactical situation) display, where all information for navigation and the tactical situation are combined and projected. Aerial targets, SAM engagements zones, RWR contacts, area boundaries, maps, routes and FAOR (fighter area of responsibility) limits are also displayed on the VTB. In tactical mode, the VTB's primary function is to enhance pilot situational awareness through datalinks such as Link16 or LU2. It allows the pilot to monitor a real-time view of the formation, sharing flight data (altitude, speed), remaining missiles, target assignments, and RWR status (who is illuminated and from where). Control of the network is managed either by the formation leader, or by a ground-based command and control station or an airborne early warning and control aircraft, which also handles IFF (identification friend or foe).

The side consoles are mostly dedicated to the control of radios, engine start-up and navigational aids (ILS, TACAN/VOR and INS navigation).

To allow easier control during air combat manoeuvring, various controls were moved to the HOTAS system.

The Mirage 2000-5 Mk.2 upgrade introduced higher-resolution, night-vision-compatible LCD displays, and replaced the legacy PCN (poste commande navigation) INS panel with a Thales TOTEM 3000 INS/GPS data entry and display unit. Another upgrade is the addition of a second V/UHF radio with frequency evasion and enhanced encoding, replacing the older UHF "Red" radio that was installed on the Mirage 2000C and -5F. All of these enhancements were enabled by the integration of the Rafale's MDPU.

== Variants ==
=== Mirage 2000-5F ===
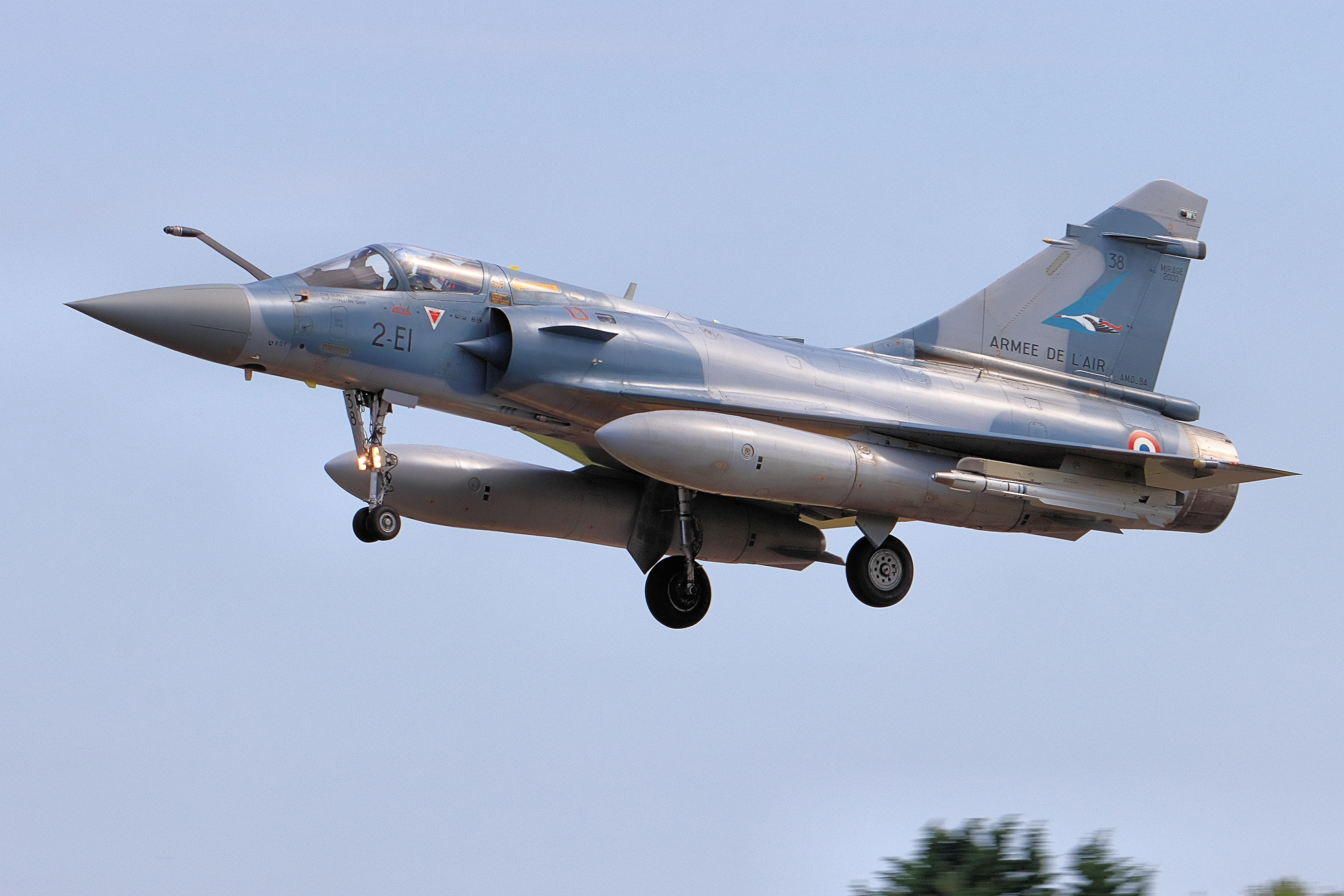
Mirage 2000-5F "2-EI" from EC 1/2 Cigognes on final approach for landing.

Originally independent from Dassault's private venture, the Armée de l'Air eventually acquiesced, financing the conversion of 37 Mirage 2000C S-4 to the 2000-5F ("F" for "France") standard. Prototype conversions of aircraft Nos. 51 and 77 were done at Istres, with the first flight of the new standard achieved on 26 February 1997. Airframe No. 38 was transferred to Istres on 30 December 1997 to meet contractual obligations, but it wasn't transferred to CEAM (a test and experimentation unit) for pilot training until April 1998. Externally, the 2000-5F is identical to the Mirage 2000C, with two key differences: the radome pitot tube was removed, and a LAM (liaison avion-missile) datalink antenna was added on the tail to enable mid-course updates with MICA missiles.

Mirage 2000-5F airframes were divided in two distinct production lots:

- Mirage 2000-5F-SF1: This is the initial variant that entered in service in 1999, and in a lot of ways remained unchanged to this day. Initially it was equipped solely with 4 MICA EM missiles mounted on the fuselage and 2 R.550 Magic IIs on the outboard wing pylons, with the MICA IR entering service in 2000, slowly replacing the Magic IIs. The -5F variant differs from the ones promoted for export, notably by the exclusion of the superhet antenna on the tail, thus retaining the French self-defense equipment developed for the Mirage 2000C (Serval, Sabre and Spirale), although with slight modifications. Converted aircraft included Nos. 38, 39, 73 and 78.
- Mirage 2000-5F-SF2: Proposed upgraded variant for French use. It would've featured a GPS navigation system, a JTIDS-type datalink, integration of a helmet-mounted sight and some kind of long-distance identification tool; electro-optical or infrared based. It is unclear if these upgrades were ever fielded, although it's very probable that the GPS navigation and Link16 JTIDS were actually implemented in the Mirage 2000-9 and later variants.

On 6 June 2024, French President Emmanuel Macron announced the transfer of an unspecified number of Mirage 2000-5Fs from Escadron de Chasse 1/2 Cigognes to Ukraine, with pilot training already in progress. The first aircraft arrived on 6 February 2025, having undergone modifications prior to delivery, including the removal of the refuelling probe and the alleged integration of the SCALP-EG missile and AASM Hammer bombs. On 7 March 2025 the Ukrainian Air Force would announce with an Instagram post that the newly delivered platform participated in air defense activities, downing several Kh-101 cruise missiles and drones.

On 12 February 2025 the chief of staff of the French Air and Space Forces, Jérôme Bellanger reported that Mirage 2000-5Fs and Rafale fighter downed "nearly a dozen Shahed-type drones" during air patrolling missions over the Red Sea. These Mirages were most likely deployed from the French airbase in Djibouti.

On 17 November 2025, the official social media channels of the Ukrainian Air Force released a video featuring one of the recently transferred Mirage 2000-5F fighters. The aircraft displayed 6 kill markings on its nose, most likely representing Kh-101 cruise missiles intercepted during air defence operations over Ukraine. The aircraft is seen armed with R.550 Magic II infrared-guided missiles.

=== Mirage 2000-9 (2000-5Mk.2) ===
On 16 December 1997, at the time of President Chirac's visit to the country, the United Arab Emirates announced that it had placed an order for 32 newly built Mirage 2000-9s, with the agreement also including the conversion of 30 existing Mirage 2000EADs, RADs and biplace DADs to the -9 standard, totalling 62 Mirage 2000-9.

This enhanced -5 interceptor variant was tailored to Abu Dhabi's requirements: a long-range strike platform capable of carrying six MICA missiles (the IR version was still nearing service entry at the time of the contract's signing), Laser Designation Pod (Shehab) to guide already integrated laser-guided bombs and FLIR (Nahar). Most importantly, this variant represented the Mirage 2000's first true leap into multi-role capability, with advanced ground-attack functions made possible by the RDY-2 radar suite. The upgraded system introduced high-resolution SAR mapping, dedicated air-to-sea modes and terrain-following capabilities. In the electronic warfare realm, the -9 program birthed the ICMS Mk.II system, with the addition of a third superhet antenna on the tail (absent from 2000-5Fs). These tactical improvements were enabled by the Rafale's modular data processing unit (MDPU), which provided greater data fusion capability and simplified the integration of new weapons, other than the potential for modular upgrades. Finally, the cockpit was upgraded with new LCD displays, night vision goggles compatibility and a gyro-laser inertial navigation system.

In November 1998 the US$3.4 billion deal was finalized, pushing the delivery timeline further. Around this time it was announced that the UAE chose the MATRA/BAe Black Shaheen/SCALP-EG over the GEC-Marconi PGM 500 Centaur powered bomb as the chosen ground attack munition for the type. Dassault started deliveries of the initial SAD91 standard at the end of April and continued until early 2004. Weapons system development continued until 2005 with the delivery of SAD92, improving over different aspects. Retrofitting of existing aircraft to -9 standard continued until 2007.

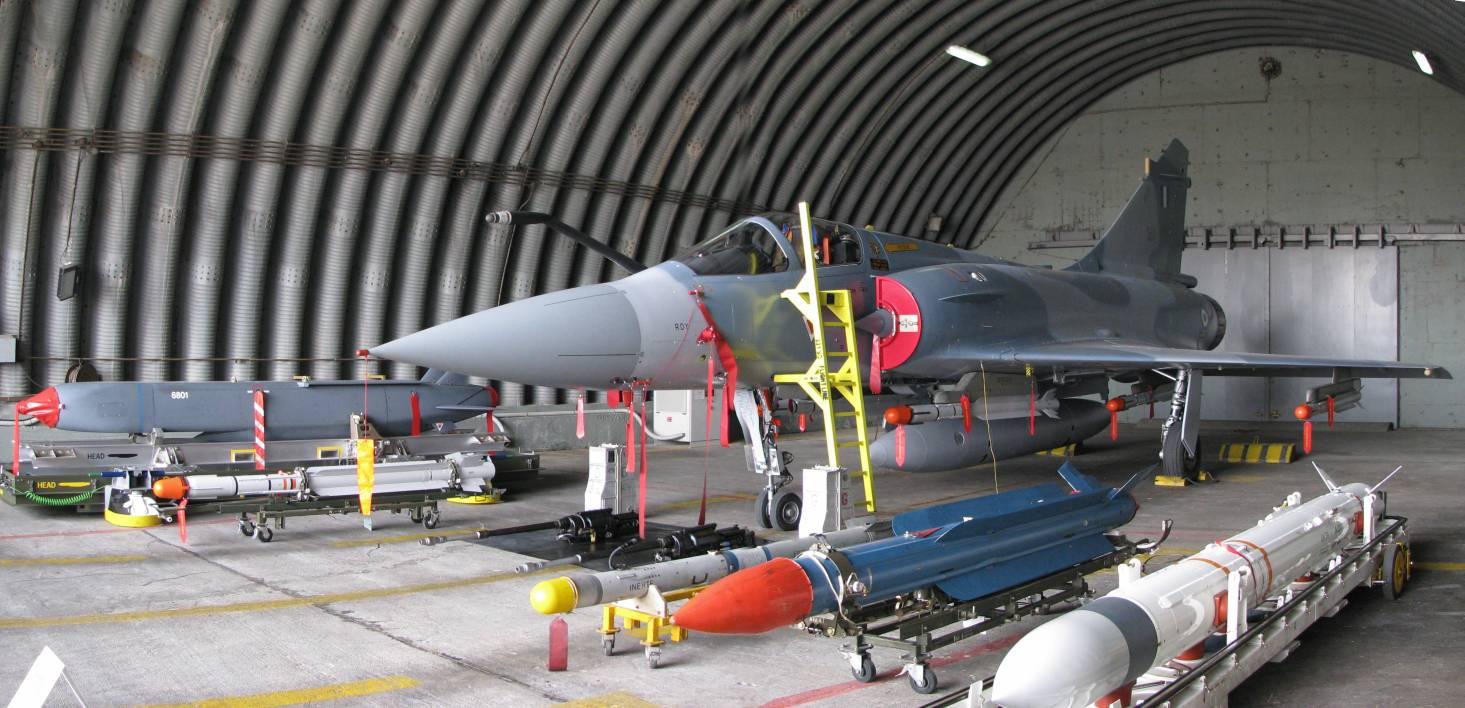
HAF Mirage 2000-5Mk.2 in a hangar.

In 1999 the Hellenic Air Force ordered a new anti-ship missile, the AM.39 Exocet. With the integration of this weapon, the outdated HAF Mirage 2000EG/BG received maritime strike capabilities, being redesignated 2000EGM/BGM. In 2000, Greece decided to sign an agreement for the purchase of 15 newly built Mirage 2000-9s, now renamed 2000-5Mk.II, and the conversìon of 10 more EGM/BGMs to 2000-5 Mk.II standard through upgrade kits provided by Dassault. These initial 15 airframes had to be delivered without the newly designed ICMS Mk.III self-protection system due to reported problems, with the French-Greek IFEPG (In Flight Evaluation Program Group) auditing both RDY-2 and ICMS Mk.III strarting from the summer of 2003 until April 2006. This was not a first for HAF in terms of complaints about Mirage 2000 deliveries: In the 1980s, during the initial order of the type, Greece refused to accept the airframes due to RDM radar problems.

=== Mirage 2000-5E (EI and EDA) ===
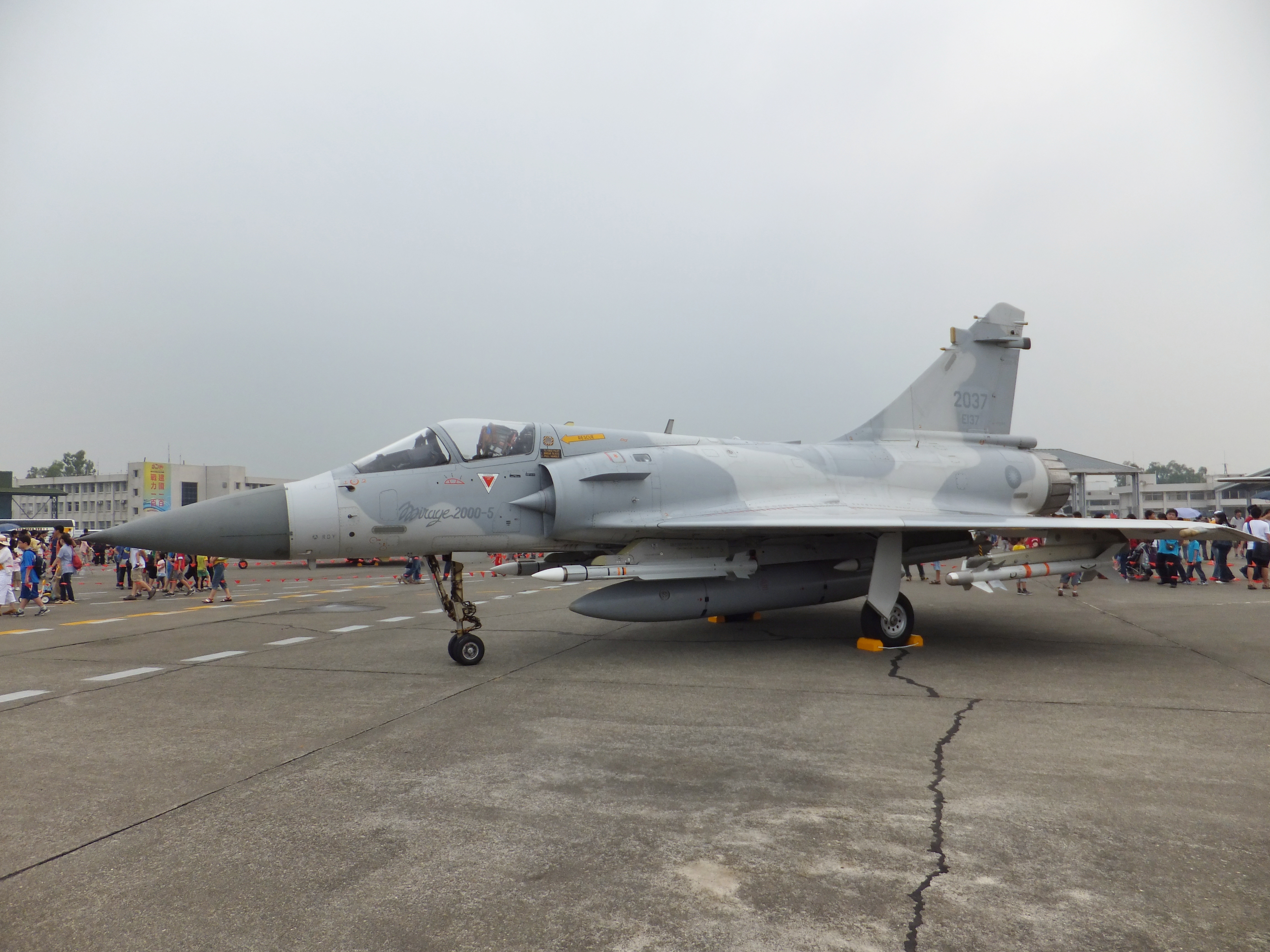
ROCAF Mirage 2000-5EI displayed at Gangshan Air Force Base, equipped with MICA EM missiles on the fuselage pylons, R.550 Magic IIs on the wingtips and a centreline fuel tank.

In November 1992, Taiwan ordered 48 single-seat Mirage 2000-5EI and 12 twin-seat Mirage 2000-5DI fighters. Deliveries began on 5 May 1997, with the first squadron achieving initial operational capability in November of that year. The Taiwanese Mirage configuration is optimized for air-defense missions, closely mirroring the French Mirage 2000-5F, but is instead equipped with the full ICMS Mk.II self-protection suite, identifiable by its 5 fin-mounted antennas. Uniquely, aside from the French -5F, the -5EI/DI is the only Mirage 2000-5 variant configured exclusively for air-to-air combat, carrying no air-to-ground kinetic weapons, with the ASTAC SIGINT pod serving in the passive signal-gathering role. Its offensive armament is limited to R.550 Magic II short-range infrared missiles and MICA EM beyond-visual-range missiles.

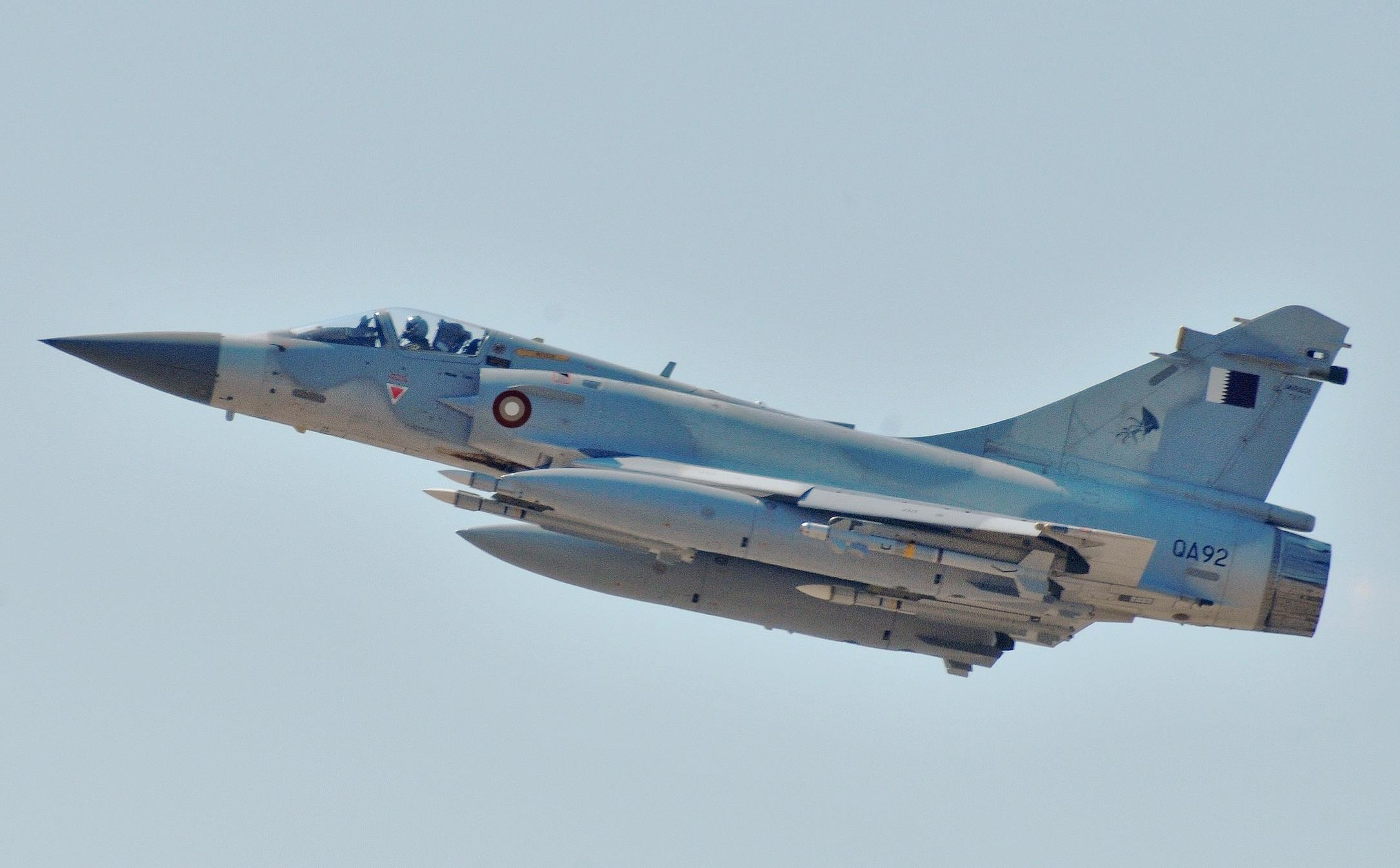
Qatari Dassault Mirage 2000-5EDA participating in Odyssey Dawn.

In July 1994 Qatar placed an order for 12 aircraft said to be worth around US$280 million: 9 single-seat -5EDA and 3 biplace -5DDA, with the -5EDAs serialled QA90 to QA98. These units retained all of the advancements developed for the Mirage 2000-9 family, with the addition of ground-attack capabilities tailor-made for Qatar's needs such as the integration of the Matra/BAe APACHE (an earlier iteration of the SCALP-EG dedicated to runway denial), AS30L, BGL 1000 with laser designator; and BAP 100, Durandal and laser guided bombs. The Thales ASTAC signal intelligence pod is also available. The first four Qatari Mirage 2000-5 (including some two-seat units) were delivered on 18 December 1997. In June 2023, Indonesia confirmed that it had signed a contract earlier in the year to purchase all 12 of Qatar's Mirage 2000-5 fighters through the Czech company Excalibur International, in a deal valued at US$795.14 million. The acquisition followed Qatar's decision to retire the Mirages early as part of a broader modernization of its air force, which has recently seen orders placed for 24 Dassault Rafales, 24 Eurofighter Typhoons, and 36 Boeing F-15QAs. At the time, Indonesian Defense Minister Prabowo Subianto noted that the aircraft had logged only around 30% of their available flight hours, giving them an estimated service life of at least 15 more years.

However, by January 2024, Indonesia announced its intention to delay, or more likely cancel, the purchase due to budgetary constraints. By June 2024, reports indicated that India had entered negotiations to acquire the Qatari Mirage 2000-5 fleet instead to purchase spares and airframes for their fleet of Mirage 2000Is.

=== Mirage 2000I ===
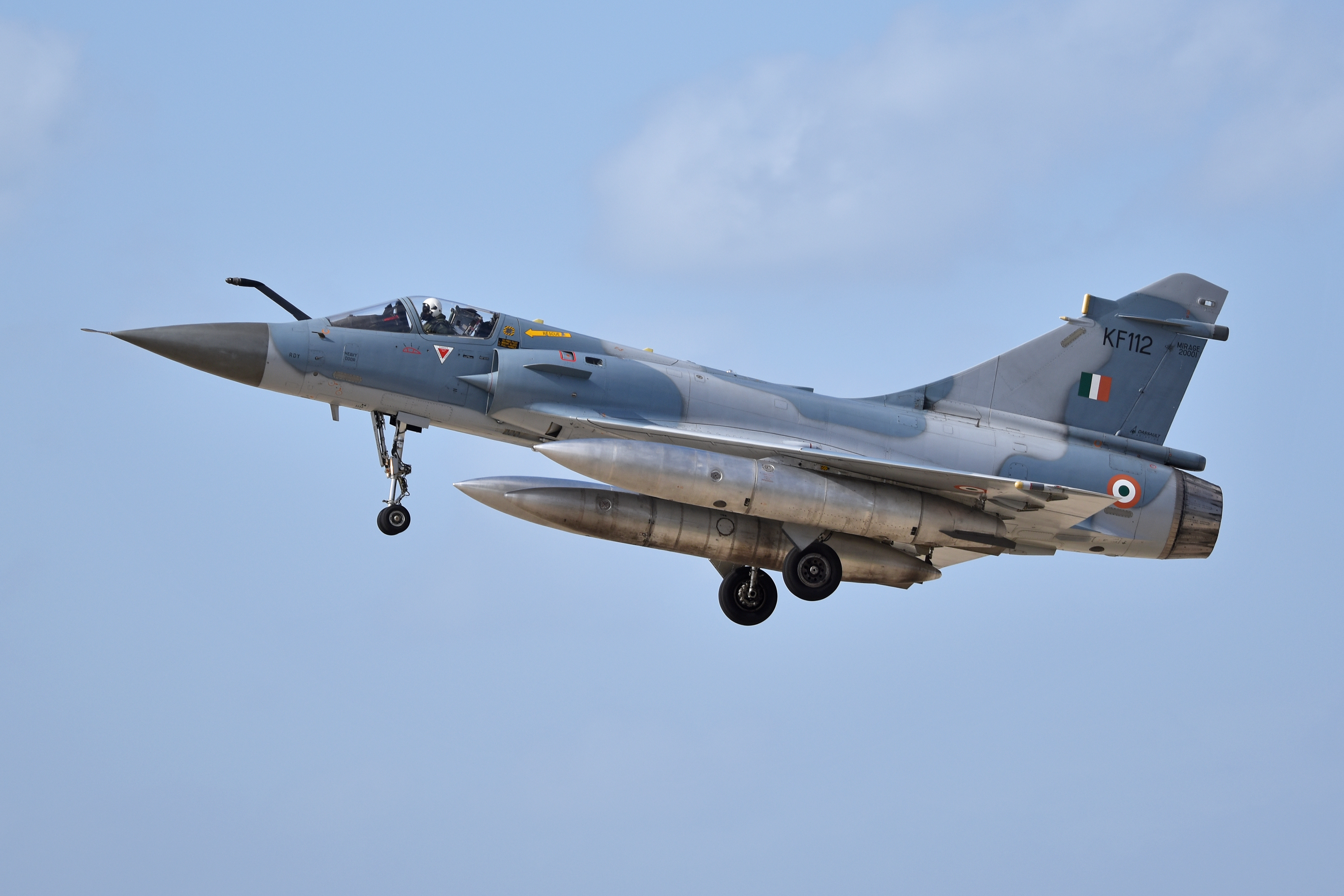
A Mirage 2000I from the 40th Wing of the Indian Air Force, landing at RAF Waddington during exercise Cobra Warrior 23–1 on 22 March 2023.

Between 1982 and 1985 India signed a purchase agreement for 51 Mirage 2000 aircraft. In its first attempt during the 1980s, the IAF planned to acquire about 150 Mirage aircraft, with 40 delivered in fly-away condition and 110 to be licence-built by Hindustan Aeronautics Limited (HAL) under full technology transfer. However, the Soviet Union, a prominent supplier to the Indian armed forces pressured them to purchase MiG-29 Fulcrums, Mig-25 Foxbats and eventually licence produce Mig-27 Floggers instead.

In 2011, the Indian government signed an agreement with Thales for the conversion of 51 Mirage 2000H to the -5 standard (to be renamed Mirage 2000I Vajra in 2015). This US$2.2 billion upgrade package saw the integration of the usual -5 suite with ICMS Mk.II, though with the important distinction that RDY-3 was to be equipped, instead of RDY-2. The only difference between the standard Mirage 2000-5 and the 2000I is the presence of the pitot tube on the radome. This decision originated from the fact that the IAF didn't want to upgrade the speed/pressure system due to budgetary constraints, leading to an RDY recalibration and a consequent minor loss in performance. In 2021 the IAF arranged to purchase 24 retired Mirage 2000s at the cost of €27 million, to be used for critical spare parts and components needed to keep the fleet airworthy through the years. This was the 2nd time the IAF had to purchase phased-out airframes: In 2020, the Indian government acquired 16 retired Mirage aircraft. The Mirage 2000I fleet has been further modified through the integration of a range of imported munitions, among them the Israeli SPICE precision-guided bombs, the Russian R-73 IR missile, the POPEYE air-to-surface missile with its datalink pod and the LITENING II targeting pod.

The integration of Samtel Group's Topsight-I helmet-mounted display was proposed for the Mirage 2000I but ultimately never realized. Instead, in 2005 the Elbit Systems DASH helmet-mounted sight entered service, providing high-off-boresight targeting capabilities.
