= John Lee Keh-Mien =

Taiwanese Catholic bishop

His Excellency, The Most Reverend John Baptist Lee Keh-Mien
- Bishop of Hsinchu
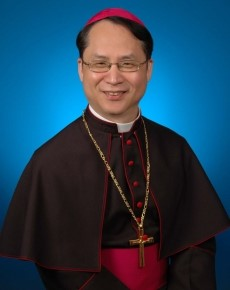
- Archdiocese: Taipei
- Diocese: Hsinchu
- Appointed: April 6, 2006
- Successor: incumbent

Orders
- Ordination: May 27, 1990
- Consecration: June 24, 2006 by Lucas Liu Hsien-tang

Personal details
- Born: 李克勉; August 23, 1958 (age 68) Tainan County, Taiwan Province, Republic of China
- Denomination: Roman Catholic
- Education: College of Chinese Culture, Fu Jen Catholic University, Maynooth College, University of Santo Tomas

Bishop John Baptist Lee Keh-mien, JCD (Chinese: 李克勉; pinyin: Lǐ Kèmiǎn; born August 23, 1958) is the fourth and current bishop of the Roman Catholic Diocese of Hsinchu, in Taiwan.

== Education and Priestly Ministry ==
Lee earned a Bachelor's degree in agriculture from the College of Chinese Culture in 1980. After completing his mandatory military service, he enrolled in the major seminary in Taipei. He graduated from Fu Jen Catholic University in 1985 with a degree in philosophy and from Maynooth College in 1989 with a degree in theology.

He was ordained to the diaconate in December 1989 and the presbyterate in May 1990. In August 1990, Lee was appointed rector of the major and minor seminaries of Taiwan. Upon completing his term as rector, he served as a parish priest before pursuing doctorate studies in canon law at the University of Santo Tomas from 1996 to 2002. He then returned to Taiwan to serve as the rector of the interdiocesan seminary in Hsinchuang.

== Episcopal ministry ==
Pope Benedict XVI appointed Lee as the Bishop of Hsinchu on April 6, 2006 and he was ordained to the episcopate on June 24, 2006, the Feast of the Nativity of St. John the Baptist, his namesake. He became the president of the Chinese Regional Bishops' Conference on July 1, 2020.
