= Martin Su Yao-wen =

Most Reverend Martin Su Yao-wen
- Bishop of Taichung
- Native name: 蘇耀文
- Archdiocese: Taipei
- Diocese: Taichung
- Appointed: 25 June 2007
- Predecessor: Joseph Wang Yu-jung
- Successor: Incumbent

Orders
- Ordination: 8 June 1989
- Consecration: 25 September 2007 by Joseph Wang Yu-jung

Personal details
- Born: 9 November 1959 (age 66) Kaohsiung, Taiwan
- Denomination: Roman Catholic
- Education: Fu Jen Catholic University; Fordham University
- Motto: UNUM IN SPIRITU SANCTO 因聖神合一
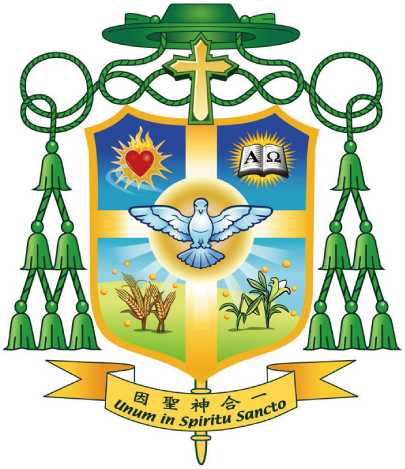
- Coat of arms

Martin Su Yao-wen (Chinese: 蘇耀文; born 9 November 1959) is the current serving Roman Catholic bishop of the Roman Catholic diocese of Taichung, Taiwan.

== Early life ==
Martin was born in Kaohsiung, Taiwan on 9 November 1959. He studied at Holy Spirit minor seminary in Taichung, Taipei major seminary and completed his philosophy and theology at Fu Jen University.

== Priesthood ==
On 8 June 1989, Martin was ordained a priest for the Roman Catholic diocese of Taichung, Taiwan. He also studied at St. Louis University, San Francisco, U.S.A., for a diploma in Religious Education. He acquired Licentiate in Religious Education from Fordham University, New York.

== Episcopate ==
Pope Benedict XVI appointed Martin as bishop of the Roman Catholic diocese of Taichung on 25 June 2007 and he was consecrated a bishop on 25 September 2007 by Bishop Joseph Wang Yu-jung.
