= Catholic Church in Taiwan =

- Chinese: 台灣天主教教會
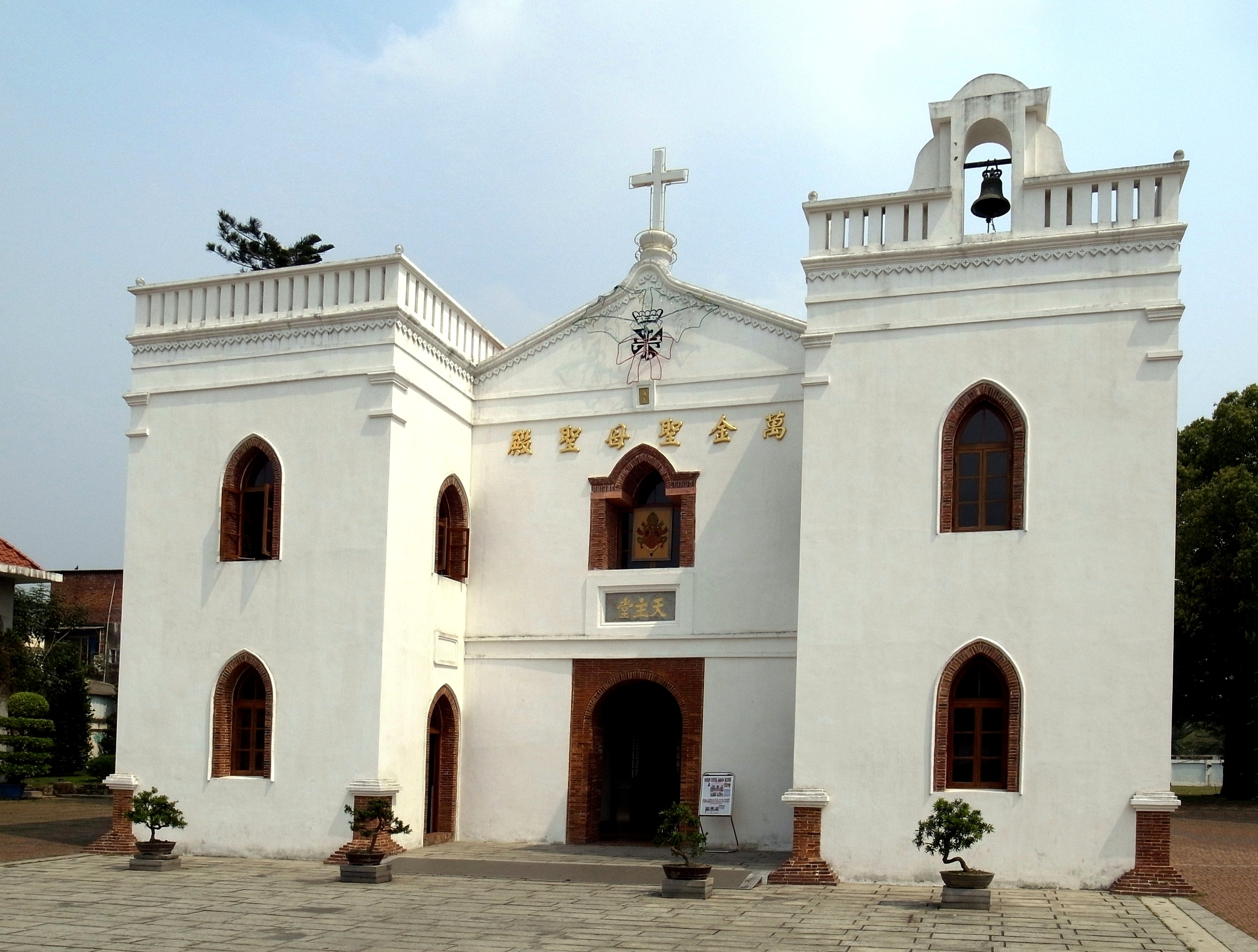
- Basilica of the Immaculate Conception in Wanchin
- Type: National polity
- Classification: Catholic
- Orientation: Latin
- Scripture: Bible
- Theology: Catholic theology
- Polity: Episcopal
- Governance: Chinese Regional Bishops' Conference
- Pope: Leo XIV
- President: John Baptist Lee Keh-mien
- Apostolic Nuncio: Msgr. Stefano Mazzotti
- Region: Taiwan
- Language: Latin, Mandarin, Taiwanese, English, Hakka
- Headquarters: Taipei, Taiwan
- Origin: 1626; Spanish Formosa, Spanish Empire
- Branched from: Catholic Church in Spain
- Members: 221,000 (2021)
- Official website: www.catholic.org.tw/en/

Dioceses of Taiwan

The Catholic Church in Taiwan is part of the worldwide Catholic Church, under the spiritual leadership of the Pope in Rome. The Church operates two universities, the Fu Jen Catholic University, and Providence University.

== Demography ==
According to the 2005 census, Christianity in Taiwan constituted 3.9% of the population; this included approximately 300,000 Catholics.

Estimates in 2020 suggested that the portion had risen to 4% or 6%, with Catholics making up 1% of the country's population. In the same year there were over 600 priests and 1,000 nuns serving in 424 parishes.

== History ==
In 1514, Taiwan was included in the Diocese of Funchal as a missionary jurisdiction; there was some organized Catholic activity on the island. In 1576, the first Chinese diocese, the Diocese of Macau, was established in Macau, a Portuguese colony, and covered most of China as well as Taiwan. The diocese of Macau was sub-divided several times over the next few centuries. In 1626, Northern Taiwan became a Spanish colony. In 1631, Jacinto Esquivel, a Spanish Dominican friar, built a church in Northern Taiwan. In chronological order, Taiwan belonged to the Archdiocese of Manila (1627), the Apostolic Vicariate (now Archdiocese) of Nanking (1660), the Apostolic Vicariate of Fujian (now the Archdiocese of Fuzhou) (1696) and the Apostolic Vicariate (now Diocese) of Amoy (1883).

In 1913, the Apostolic Prefecture of the Island of Taiwan (then called Formosa in foreign languages) was established out of the Diocese of Amoy. It was renamed Apostolic Prefecture of Kaohsiung in 1949, when the Apostolic Prefecture of Taipei (now the Archdiocese of Taipei) was established out of its territory.

Before the end of World War II the Catholic Church had a very minor presence in Taiwan, based mainly in the south of the island and centred on Spanish Dominican priests who went there from the Philippines in the 1860s. In 1948, there were less than 10,000 Catholics on Taiwan and 15 clergy. The end of World War II and the following years saw a mass migration of religious communities from mainland China as Communist persecution began to take effect following the Chinese Communist Revolution in 1949. As a result, the Catholic Church has many Mandarin-speaking emigrants from the mainland.

In September 1951 the Papal Internuncio to China was expelled to Hong Kong. Since 1952, the Papal internuncio has been stationed in Taiwan (Republic of China). Also, the ROC ambassador to the Holy See has provided the only permanent diplomatic link between China and the Holy See. Attempts to move the Papal nuncio to Beijing have failed, as the Holy See has not accepted demands by the People's Republic of China that it sever its diplomatic links with Taiwan.

Pope John XXIII created three new dioceses on Taiwan in 1959.

After the Second Vatican Council, the episcopacy on Taiwan established the Chinese Catholic Bishops Conference.

In 1988, the Congregation for the Evangelization of the Peoples told the Taiwan episcopacy not to inquire into the Church's mainland China affairs and to instead limit their mission to Overseas Chinese and Chinese students overseas.

In 1998, the Vatican's Secretariat of State requested that the Chinese Catholic Bishops Conference be renamed the Chinese Regional Bishops Conference (天主教台灣地區主教團 in Chinese, meaning the Taiwan Region Catholic Bishops Conference). The name change implied a diminished status.

The current archbishop of Taipei is Thomas Chung An-Zu (鐘安住), who was appointed on 23 May 2020 to succeed John Hung Shan-chuan (洪山川), S.V.D., who retired in the same year.

On 19 February 2021, Pope Francis formally granted a decree of canonical coronation for a Marian image of Our Lady of China, currently venerated at the National Shrine of Our Lady of China in Chiayi County, Taiwan.

== Dioceses ==
- Archdiocese of Taipei (台北), established 1949, archdiocese since 1952
- Diocese of Kaohsiung (高雄), established 1913, renamed 1949, elevated 1961
- Diocese of Taichung (台中), established 1951, elevated 1962
- Diocese of Chiayi (嘉義), established 1952, elevated 1962
- Diocese of Hwalien (花蓮), established 1952, elevated 1963
- Diocese of Hsinchu (新竹), established 1961
- Diocese of Tainan (台南), established 1961
- Kinma Apostolic Administration (金馬), established 1968

== See also ==
- Catholic Church in China
- Catholic Church in Hong Kong
- Catholic Church in Macau
- Chinese Rites Controversy
- Christianity in Taiwan
- Holy See–Taiwan relations
