= Diocese of Hsinchu =

Roman Catholic diocese in Taiwan

Coordinates: 24.8092°N 120.9668°E

Diocese of Hsinchu Dioecesis Hsinchuensis 天主教新竹教區
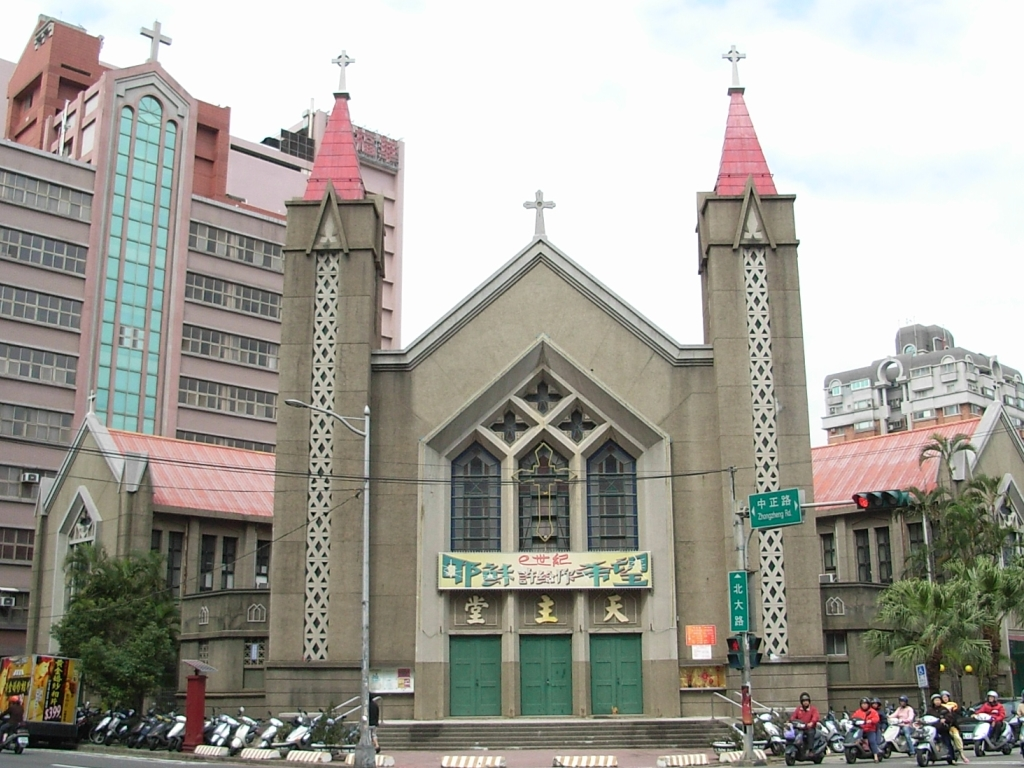
- Immaculate Conception Cathedral

Location
- Country: Taiwan
- Territory: Hsinchu, Taoyuan, and counties of Hsinchu and Miaoli
- Ecclesiastical province: Taipei
- Archdeaconries: 4

Statistics
- Area: 4,750 km^{2} (1,830 sq mi)
- Population: Total; Catholics: (as of 2006); 3,308,629; 52,565 (1.6%)
- Parishes: 50
- Members: 40,835

Information
- Denomination: Roman Catholic
- Sui iuris church: Latin Church
- Rite: Roman Rite
- Established: 21 March 1961
- Cathedral: Cathedral of The Immaculate Conception in Hsinchu
- Patron saint: Immaculate Heart of Mary
- Secular priests: 24

Current leadership
- Pope: Leo XIV
- Bishop: John Baptist Lee Keh-mien
- Metropolitan Archbishop: Thomas Chung An-zu
- Vicar General: James Liu Tan-kuei; Alexander Doan Trung Quang
- Episcopal Vicars: Joseph Truong Van-Phuc; Edmund Ryden (雷敦龢), SJ
- Bishops emeritus: Lucas Liu Hsien-tang Bishop Emeritus (1983-2004); James Liu Tan-kuei Bishop Emeritus (2004-2005)

Map
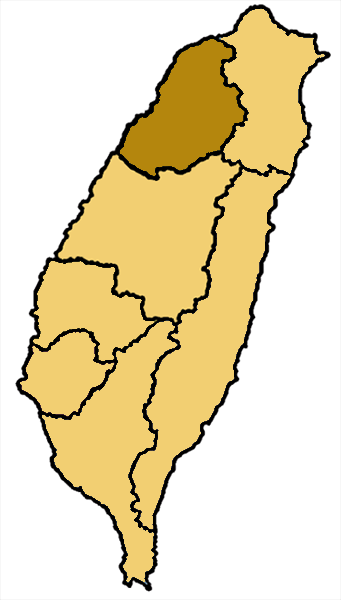

Website
- Website of the Diocese

The Diocese of Hsinchu (traditional Chinese: 天主教新竹教區; simplified Chinese: 天主教新竹教区; pinyin: Tiānzhǔjiào Xīnzhú Jiàoqū; Latin: Dioecesis Hsinchuensis) is a Latin Church diocese of the Catholic Church in Taiwan.

Erected as the Diocese of Hsinchu in 1961, the diocese is suffragan to the Archdiocese of Taipei, and covers northwestern Taiwan.

The current bishop is John Baptist Lee Keh-mien, appointed in November 2006.

== Ordinaries ==
- Petrus Pao-Zin Tou † (21 Mar 1961 Appointed - 29 Jun 1983 Resigned)
- Lucas Liu Hsien-tang (29 Jun 1983 Succeeded - 4 Dec 2004 Retired)
- James Liu Tan-kuei (4 Dec 2004 Appointed - 30 May 2005 Resigned)
- John Baptist Lee Keh-mien (6 Apr 2006 Appointed - )

== See also ==
- Catholic Church in Taiwan
