= Vincent Han-Sun Chiang =

Taiwanese physician

- 江漢聲
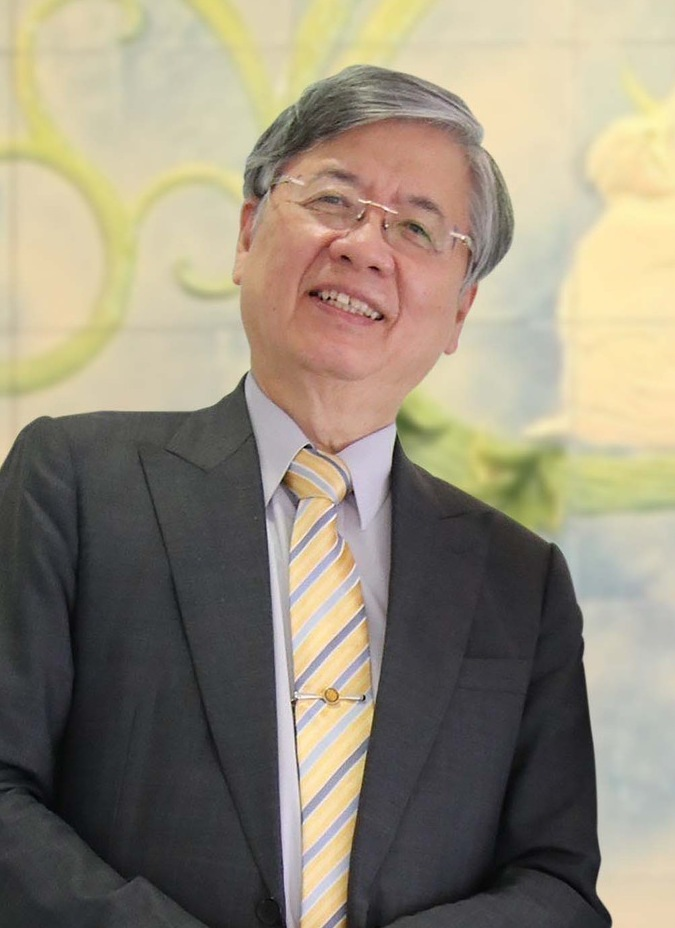
- Chiang in 2024

9th President of Fu Jen Catholic University
- In office 2012–2025
- Preceded by: Bernard Li
- Succeeded by: Francis Yi-Chen Lan

Personal details
- Born: 26 March 1950 (age 76) Taiwan
- Education: National Taiwan University (BS); Technical University of Munich (PhD)

Vincent Han-Sun Chiang (Chinese: 江漢聲; pinyin: Jiāng Hànshēng; born 26 March 1950) is a Taiwanese physician, medical professor and the former president of Fu Jen Catholic University. He was also the president of the Association of Christian Universities and Colleges in Asia (ACUCA) during 2012 to 2014.

== Early life and education ==
Vincent Chiang was born into a medical family. His father, Chiang Wan-hsuan, was a physician at National Taiwan University Hospital, and both father and son became noted urologists in Taiwan. During his childhood, he lived in a Japanese-style faculty residence at the National Taiwan University College of Medicine, an environment closely connected to the medical profession from an early age.

Vincent Chiang graduated from the National Taiwan University (NTU). He obtained a doctoral degree at the Technical University of Munich (Doktor der Medizin).

== Medical career ==
Much of Vincent Chiang's academic and medical career was spent at Taipei Medical University (TMU). He served as professor and chief of urology at Taipei Medical University Hospital, as well as director of the Graduate Institute of Medical Sciences and chair of the School of Medicine. He founded the TMU Hospital Division of Urology in 1983, indicating his long-term role in the development of the university's urological teaching and clinical system. He later served as an attending physician in the Department of Urology at National Taiwan University Hospital, and subsequently became a consultant-level physician at Cardinal Tien Hospital and Shin Kong Wu Ho-Su Memorial Hospital, the two teaching hospitals affiliated with the College of Medicine of Fu Jen Catholic University. In November 2009, he began seeing patients at Fu Jen Clinic, and he is currently an adjunct attending physician at TMU Hospital and Fu Jen Catholic University Hospital.

== Presidency ==
During his tenure as president of Fu Jen Catholic University, Vincent Chiang was associated with several developments at the university. The Fu Jen School Corporation (legal person) was established during his presidency.

In 2013, Chiang accompanied President Ma Ying-jeou of Taiwan and a four-member delegation to attend the inauguration of Pope Francis. On that occasion, products from Franz-porcelains, a company founded by Fu Jen alumni, were presented as state gifts to Pope Emeritus Benedict XVI and Pope Francis.

In 2017, Fu Jen served as one of the host institutions for the 2017 Summer Universiade. During this period, the university built Taiwan’s first FIFA-standard football stadium on a university campus and hosted international football matches for the Games. Fu Jen Catholic University Hospital also opened in 2017, and was reported to have turned from deficit to surplus in 2021.

On 21 April 2022, Chiang was confirmed to have contracted the Omicron variant of COVID-19, becoming the first university president in Taiwan to be publicly confirmed as infected. The case drew public attention to the university’s pandemic-response measures.

== Attempted attack ==
On 11 November 2025, Chiang was the target of an attempted stabbing in a consultation room at Fu Jen Catholic University Hospital. The suspect, a former Fu Jen student surnamed Tseng, was subdued at the scene by police and transferred to prosecutors for investigation on suspicion of attempted murder, assault, intimidation, and violations of the Medical law. Prosecutors subsequently petitioned the court to detain the defendant without visitation rights.

Academic offices
Preceded by Bernard Li	President of Fu Jen Catholic University; 2012–2025	Succeeded by Francis Yi-Chen Lan
