= Bukun Ismahasan Islituan =

Taiwanese writer

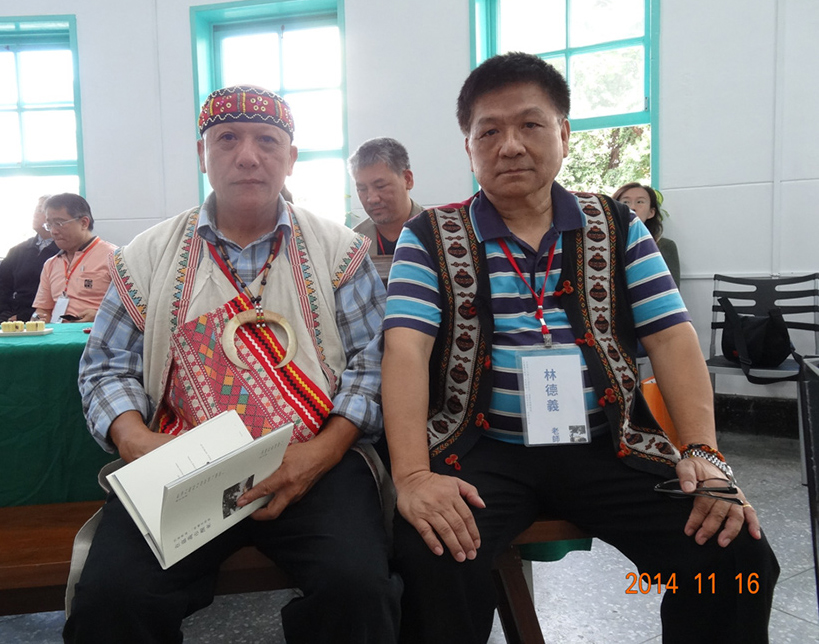
Portrait of Taiwanese indigenous writers Bukun Ismahasan Islituan (left) and Lin Tê-i.

Bukun Ismahasan Islituan (born 1956), also known as Lin Sheng-hsien (林聖賢) in Chinese, is a Taiwanese indigenous poet and writer from Isbukun Bunun. He was born in 1956 in the Maia community, Sanmin Township, Kaohsiung County (now Namasia District, Kaohsiung City). He has served as a junior high school teacher, the chairman of the Indigenous Peoples Cultural Foundation, and the president of the Bunun Cultural Development Association.

== Activities ==
In 1984, Bukun sought guidance from Pastor Chang Yu-fa (張裕發) on the Romanized version of the Bunun Bible, marking the beginning of his involvement in the study of the Bunun script. From 1987 onwards, he started organizing and documenting oral literature, annual rituals, shamanic culture, and proverbs, and engaged in ongoing dialogue and research with elders.

In 1989, he published the article "Malahtangia — The Pride of the Bunun." In 1996, he presented his first Bunun poem titled "Boundary of Hais." In 1998, he collaborated with Dahu Ismahasan and Li Wen-su (李文甦) on Walking through the Moon in Time and Space (走過時空的月亮). In 1999, he published the bilingual poetry collection Moonlight of Formosan Sugar Palm (山棕月影) in Bunun and Chinese. In 2009, he released the bilingual poetry collection Bukun Bilingual Poetry: Where the Sun Revolves (卜袞雙語詩集：太陽迴旋的地方).

Bukun writes his poetry in Bunun and then translates it into Chinese, characterizing his own works by their simultaneous presentation in Bunun and Chinese, showcasing the interaction between his people and the land, along with the unique cosmology and worldview of the Bunun people.
