= Wanrong (disambiguation) =

Wanrong (婉容; 1906–1946) was an empress of the Qing dynasty and the last Chinese empress.

Wanrong may also refer to:

- Wanrong County (万荣县), a subdivision of Yuncheng, Shanxi, China
- Wanrong, Hualien (萬榮鄉), a township in Hualien County, Taiwan
