= Fu Jen School =

Catholic philosophical school in Taiwan

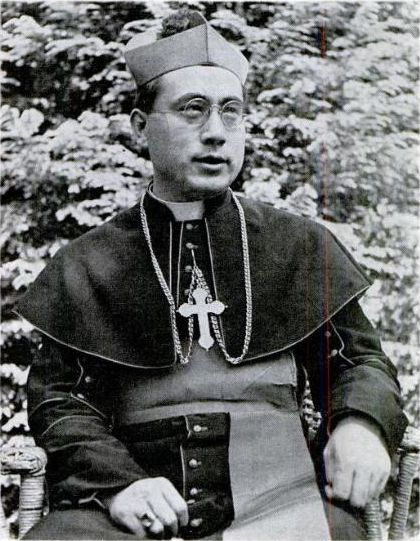
Cardinal Paul Yu Pin, the origin of Fu Jen School

Fu Jen School (輔仁學派) is a Catholic philosophical school in Taiwan. It advocates the spiritual core of Fu Jen Catholic University’s motto, and establishes a combination of Scholasticism, Neo-scholasticism, Transcendental Thomism, and Traditional Chinese philosophy, that called the "Chinese Neo Scholastic Philosophy" (中華新士林哲學).

== Former Fu Jen School ==
The original Fu Jen School refers to the historical and philosophical school developed during the Beijing period (1925–1951) of Fu Jen Catholic University. The initial purpose was to resist the New Culture Movement and anti-traditional Chinese ethics advocated by Peking University. The main scholars are represented by Chen Yuan, Yu Jiaxi (zh), Chou Tsu-mo (zh), Qigong and others.

== Fu Jen School of Philosophy ==
The development of Christian philosophy in the Far East is marked by significant historical milestones that integrate philosophical connotations from various civilizations. This integration process began with the confluence of Greek philosophy and Arabic Islamic culture, extending to the cultural exchanges of different nations after the 13th and 14th centuries. During the Ming Dynasty, the introduction of Catholicism and its philosophical underpinnings to China was spearheaded by Jesuit missionaries such as Matteo Ricci (1553-1610). Their efforts laid the groundwork for a synthesis of Christian philosophy with Chinese civilization.

Building on this rich heritage, in 1961, Paul Yu Pin, advancing the intellectual mission of Fu Jen Catholic University, established the earliest graduate institute of philosophy in Taiwan. He formulated a new university motto: "Truth, Goodness, Beauty, Sanctity," and set in motion the development of the Fu Jen Philosophy Department. This department became the singular hub of Scholasticism in Taiwan, driven by Yu Pin's philosophical theories, particularly the "Three Kinds of Knowing" (三知論).

Over the subsequent six decades following World War II, these philosophical endeavors matured into a distinct school of thought. The collective work of the scholars at Fu Jen Catholic University, deeply influenced by the centuries of Christian philosophy's evolution, gave rise to what is now recognized as the "Chinese Neo Scholastic Philosophy" group. This group and its contributions have since been acknowledged as the "Fu Jen School," a testament to the enduring legacy of the university's engagement with philosophy.

== Members ==
- Bernard Li
- Gabriel Chen-Ying Ly
- Chien-ming Chu (zh)
- Hsiao Chih Sun (zh)

and others.

== Journals ==
- Universitas: Monthly Review of Philosophy and Culture^{A&HCI}
- Fu Jen Religious Studies

== See also ==
- Kyoto School
