= Stanislaus Lo Kuang =

Bishop of Tainan

- Archbishop
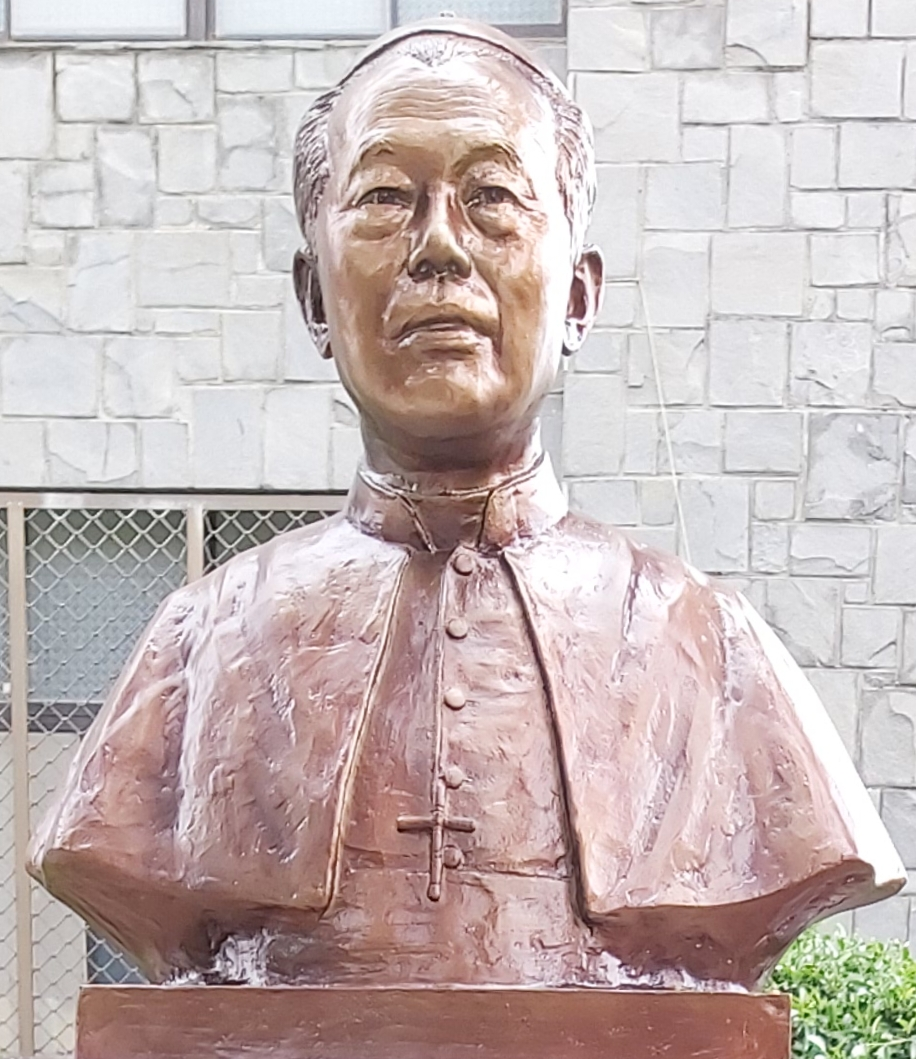
- Bust of Archbishop Stanislaus Lo Kuang

Personal details
- Born: 1 January 1911 Hengyang, Hunan, China
- Died: 28 February 2004 (aged 93) Taipei, Taiwan
- Denomination: Roman Catholic
- Occupation: college professor, college president, missionary, priest
- Education: Pontifical Urban University; Pontifical Lateran University
- Motto: IN LUMINE TUO VIDEMUS LUMEN
- Coat of arms

Archbishop Stanislaus Lo Kuang (Chinese: 羅光; pinyin: Luo Guang; 1 January 1911 – 28 February 2004) served as bishop of Tainan from 1961 to 1966, when he was appointed archbishop of Taipei. In 1978, Lo became the president of Fu Jen Catholic University, and was succeeded by Gabriel Chen-Ying Ly.

He was born in Hengyang, China.

Academic offices
Preceded by Paul Yü Pin	President of Fu Jen Catholic University; 1978–1992	Succeeded by Gabriel Chen-Ying Ly
