= China Immigration Inspection =

Chinese Government Agency for controlling the sea, air and land border checkpoints

China Immigration Inspection 中国边检
- Badge of the People's Police

- Agency Seal (used in checkpoints) with its name in Chinese calligraphy written by Qigong
- Abbreviation: CII

Agency overview
- Formed: 1998
- Dissolved: 1 December 2024
- Legal personality: Law enforcement agency

Jurisdictional structure
- Operations jurisdiction: China
- Legal jurisdiction: Mainland China
- Governing body: State Council, Central People's Government
- General nature: Civilian police

Operational structure
- Overseen by: Discipline Inspection and Supervision Team of the National Supervisory Commission of the Central Commission for Discipline Inspection of the Ministry of Public Security
- Headquarters: Beijing
- Agency executive: Xu Ganlu (许甘露)
- Parent agency: National Immigration Administration of the Ministry of Public Security

China Immigration Inspection (CII; 中国边检) was China's entry port immigration checkpoints law enforcement service from 1998 to 2024, managed by the national immigration management authorities of the Ministry of Public Security. On 1 December 2024, CII was officially merged into the newly established National Immigration Administration (NIA). The old seal was officially disposed of and all staff uniforms re-branded to the new seal of the NIA.

== History ==
In 1998, the frontier inspection stations of 9 cities: Beijing, Tianjin, Shanghai, Guangzhou, Shenzhen, Zhuhai, Xiamen, Haikou, and Shantou engaged in a reform of the active duty system to change the uniform of border inspection officer to that of the people's police (人民警察). Other border checkpoint officers continued to wear the uniforms of the People's Armed Police (PAP). On 31 December 2018, under newly announced reforms, all entry-exit border checkpoints across China were unified under the control of the newly created the National Immigration Administration.

On 21 March 2018, according to the document: "Deepening the Reform of Party and State Institutions" issued by the Central Committee of the Chinese Communist Party stated that public security border troops would no longer be listed as armed police forces, and all existing forces would be retired from active service.

On 1 January 2019, the public security border guards held a collective change-up ceremony to reorganize and professionalize border inspection agencies across the country.

The provincial (regional) entry-exit border inspection station was adjusted and the border management corps of the public security department of the province (region) was added. Vertical integration by the National Immigration Administration occurred through the revocation of Shantou Entry-Exit Border Inspection General Station, Guangdong Province, Fujian Province, and Hainan Provincial Public Security Frontier Defense Corps.

== Organization ==
China Immigration Inspection (CII) operates as a child agency of MPS. They are responsible for safeguarding national sovereignty, security, social order, management, and transportation upon entry and exit.

Administrative work related to visa issuance and residency registration are handled by the entry-exit administration bureaus of the public security bureaus of respective provinces, autonomous regions and municipalities directly under the central government. Chinese border authorities also administer entry and exit border inspection posts of Beijing, Tianjin, Shanghai, Guangzhou, Shenzhen, Xiamen, Zhuhai, Shantou and Haikou.

In 2009, China had 277 border control checkpoints, covering entry into China by air, water and land in conjunction with CII (China Immigration Inspection).

== Enforcement of exit bans ==
The agency is responsible for the enforcement of controversial exit bans, which restrict the ability of both Chinese citizens and foreign residents from leaving China, often on vaguely defined legal grounds with little to no warning. In November 2018, two Chinese American citizens Victor and Cynthia Liu were barred from exiting China on the basis the sibling's father; a former state owned enterprise official was wanted by Chinese authorities on corruption and financial fraud charges.

In May 2020, two other Chinese American citizens Daniel Hsu and Jodie Chen were also barred from leaving the country on the basis that Hsu's father embezzled some 447,874 RMB (US$62,000) while serving as the chairman of Shanghai Anhui Yu'an Industrial Corporation, a developer owned by the Anhui Provincial People's Government. Despite Hsu himself not being subject to any charges, he and his wife were both denied exit. Critics have often derided the use of exit bans as a form of collective punishment and in violation of basic human rights.

The use exit bans and detentions on family members of corruption suspects is a frequent tactic employed by the Ministry of Public Security (CII's parent agency) to pressure suspects to return to China to face prosecution. Exit bans also form the basis of China's social credit system in which delinquent debtors are placed on blacklists by Chinese courts which prevent them from leaving the country as a way of encouraging the payment of debts owed. As of 2017, some 6.7 million people had been subject to such treatment according to reporting from the Financial Times.

Exit bans are also frequently used by the ministry to prevent political dissidents and activists from leaving the country as a way of suppressing and containing dissent within overseas Chinese diaspora communities. Although exact numbers are unclear, the total estimated number of dissidents and political activists prevented from leaving the country is said to reach into the tens of thousands according to a report by Foreign Policy.

In 2025, Wells Fargo suspended all travel to China after an employee was subject to an exit ban. The same year, an employee of the United States Department of Commerce was subject to an exit ban for unspecified reasons.
