= Bernard Li =

Taiwanese philosopher

- 黎建球

8th President of Fu Jen Catholic University
- In office 2004–2012
- Preceded by: John Ning-Yuean Lee
- Succeeded by: Vincent Han-Sun Chiang

Personal details
- Born: 3 June 1943 (age 82) Jiangxi, China
- Education: Fu Jen Catholic University (BA, MA, PhD)

Bernard Li, KSG, KHS (黎建球; Hanyu pinyin: Li Jianqiu; 3 June 1943–) is a Taiwanese philosopher and former president of Fu Jen Catholic University. He is known for the official founder of Fu Jen School and Fu Jen Academia Catholica.

He obtained his bachelor's, master's, and doctoral degrees at Fu Jen Catholic University.

== Honors ==
- Order of St. Gregory the Great
- Order of the Holy Sepulchre
- Order of Brilliant Star

Academic offices
Preceded by John Ning-Yuean Lee	President of Fu Jen Catholic University; 2004–2012	Succeeded by Vincent Han-Sun Chiang
