= Wanrong, Hualien =

Wanrong Township 萬榮鄉 Wanjung
- Mountain indigenous township
- Coordinates: 24°3′5″N 121°36′30″E
- Country: Taiwan
- County: Hualien County

Government
  - Type: Township

Area
  - Total: 618.4910 km^{2} (238.8007 sq mi)

Population (February 2023)
  - Total: 6,154
- Time zone: UTC+8 (CST)
- Post code: 979
- Subdivision: 6 Villages
- Website: www.wanrung.gov.tw (Chinese)

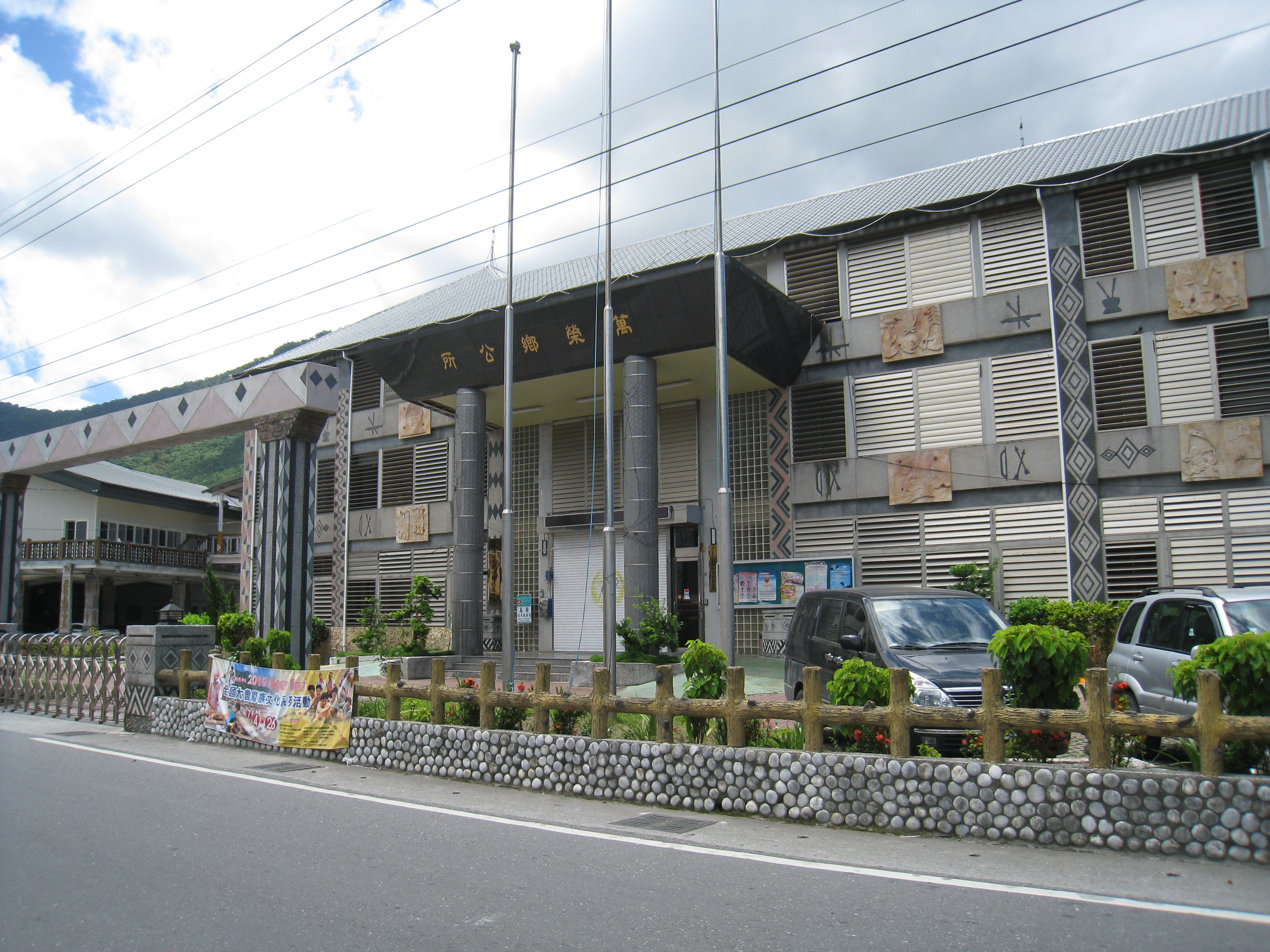
Wanrong Township Office

Wanrong Township or Wanrung Township (Chinese: 萬榮鄉; pinyin: Wànróng Xiāng) is a mountain indigenous township located in the west of Hualien County, Taiwan, and has a population of 6,154 inhabitants and 8 villages.

The elevation and climate changes greatly with the mountains of Central Range, and the adverse elevation is about 600 m. The main inhabitants are Truku people, Bunun people and Atayal people of the Taiwanese aborigines, and most economic activity is agriculture, which located in the small plain near Fenglin Township. The abundant resources of tourism has not been developed.

== Administrative divisions ==
The township comprises six villages: Hongye, Jianqing, Mayuan, Mingli, Wanrong and Xilin.

== Tourist attractions ==
- Hongye Hot Spring
- Lintian Mountain Forestry Center
- Mount Erzih Hot Spring
- Qicai Lake
- Wanrong Hot Spring
- Fuyuan National Forest Recreation Area (Butterfly Valley)
- Lintianshan (molisaka) Lumbering Culture Area

== Transportation ==
- Wanrong Station, Hualien-Taitung Line of Taiwan Railway (located in Fengling Township)
- Provincial Highway 9
- Provincial Highway 16 (partial)
- Hualien County Road No.16
- Hualien County Road No.45

== Notable natives ==
- Bokeh Kosang, actor and singer

== See also ==
- Repatriation of Bunun remains at National Taiwan University
