= Francis Yi-Chen Lan =

Taiwanese-Australian management scientist

- 藍易振

10th President of Fu Jen Catholic University
- Incumbent
- Assumed office 2025
- Preceded by: Vincent Han-Sun Chiang

Personal details
- Born: 1969 (age 56–57) Taipei, Taiwan
- Education: Western Sydney University (BA, MA, PhD)

Francis Yi-Chen Lan (Chinese: 藍易振; pinyin: Lan Yizhen; born 1969) is a Taiwanese-Australian management scientist who is currently the President of Fu Jen Catholic University.

He also served as the former vice-president of Western Sydney University and the Overseas Affairs Advisor of the Taiwan OCAC.

== Early life and education ==
Lan was born in Shilin District, Taipei City, Taiwan, in 1969. After graduating from St. Francis High School in Taipei in 1992, he went to Australia to study and successively obtained bachelor's, master's and doctoral degrees from Western Sydney University (WSU).

After graduating with a Ph.D. in 2002, he stayed at WSU to teach and served successively as professor, department chair, associate dean of the Business School, and international director of the WSU Department of Asset Management.

== Career ==
=== WSU ===
When Lan served as the provost of the Vietnam campus of Western Sydney University, he went to Mae Sot in the Myanmar border area many times to engage in teacher training and youth education. He also established the WSU School of International Education's "Humanitarian Scholarship" program to support Burmese refugees and students studying in Vietnam.

During his tenure as WSU Vice President, he successfully promoted WSU to rank SDGs first in the world in the Times Higher Education Impact Ranking. He is also the Ethnic Chinese with the highest position in the tertiary education in Australia system.

He was a member of the Australian Computer Society from 2000 to 2017. Before returning to Taiwan, he had accumulated thirty years of education and academic service experience in Australia.

=== Fu Jen ===
On September 21, 2023, Lan was announced as the president-elect of Fu Jen Catholic University by Fu Jen Board of Trustees. On December 14, it was approved by Congregation for Catholic Education and announced by the Roman Curia. On January 4 of the following year, the Ministry of Education (Taiwan) responded with approval and was officially appointed by Fu Jen.

He has officially assumed the post of president of Fu Jen Catholic University on February 1, 2025.

== Recognition ==
- 2014 - Honorary Doctorate from University of Economics Ho Chi Minh City, Vietnam
- 2023 - Century Medal, Institute of International Education, United States
- 2024 - OCAC Yushan Overseas Community Affairs Professional Medal, Taiwan

Academic offices
Preceded by Vincent Han-Sun Chiang	President of Fu Jen Catholic University; 2025–present	Succeeded by N/A (incumbent)
