= National Chung Hsing University College of Medicine =

The National Chung Hsing University College of Medicine (Chinese: 國立中興大學醫學院), or "College of Medicine, NCHU", is the medical school of the National Chung Hsing University (NCHU) located in Taichung City in central Taiwan. Founded in 2022, the medical college is in charge of medical education, academic research and health treatment.

== History ==
In 2020, National Chung Hsing University applied to the Taiwan Ministry of Education for establishment of a department of post-baccalaureate medicine.

On February 9, 2022, the Ministry of Education approved the application of National Chung Hsing University to establish a department of post-baccalaureate medicine. It was to admit students with bachelor degrees in various fields for further study in medicine, among whom a quota of 23 government-funded students was approved for the 2022 academic year.

On August 1, 2022, the National Chung Hsing University College of Medicine was officially established, including the department of post-baccalaureate medicine and a doctoral program in tissue engineering and regenerative medicine. The department is the only post-baccalaureate department in central Taiwan.

On August 1, 2024, the Graduate Institute of Clinical Medicine, NCHU was established.

== Teaching Hospitals ==
There are four teaching hospitals:

- Taichung Veterans General Hospital,
- Changhua Christian Hospital,
- Tung’s Taichung MetroHarbor Hospital,
- Show Chwan Healthcare System

== Other information ==
The National Chung Hsing University published 31 papers in health sciences and 12 in biomedical sciences listed in Nature Index for the time period of 1 June 2025 - 30 May 2026, ranking 644 and 842 respectively in the world.

In the "QS World University Rankings by Subject: Medicine 2026", National Chung Hsing University College of Medicine ranks in 701-850th globally.

Address: No. 145, Xingda Road, South District, Taichung City, Taiwan

== See also ==
- National Chung Hsing University
- List of medical schools in Taiwan
