= Peter Tuen-Ho Yang =

Taiwanese jurist

- 楊敦和

6th President of Fu Jen Catholic University
- In office 1996–2000
- Preceded by: Gabriel Chen-Ying Ly
- Succeeded by: John Ning-Yuean Lee

6th President of St. John's University (Taiwan)
- In office 2002–2008
- Preceded by: Chang Chung-ping
- Succeeded by: Chen Chin-lien

Personal details
- Born: 11 November 1941 (age 85) Taiwan
- Education: National Taipei University (LLB, LLM); University of California, Berkeley (JSD)

Peter Tuen-Ho Yang (楊敦和; Hanyu pinyin: Yang Duenhe; 11 November 1941–) is a Taiwanese jurist and former president of Fu Jen Catholic University and St. John's University (Taiwan). Since 2014, he has served as a member of Chairman of the Board of Wenzao Ursuline University of Languages.

He graduated from the College of Law and Business, National Chung Hsing University (present National Taipei University). He obtained a doctoral degree at the University of California, Berkeley.

Academic offices
| Preceded by Gabriel Chen-Ying Ly | President of Fu Jen Catholic University; 1996–2000 | Succeeded by John Ning-Yuean Lee |
| Preceded by Chang Chung-ping | President of St. John's University (Taiwan); 2002–2008 | Succeeded by Chen Chin-lien |
