= National Sun Yat-sen University College of Medicine =

Medical school in Kaohsiung, Taiwan

The National Sun Yat-sen University College of Medicine (Chinese: 國立中山大學醫學院), or "College of Medicine, National Sun Yat-sen University", is the medical school of National Sun Yat-sen University located in Kaohsiung, Taiwan. It was stablished in 2022, as the first public university medical school in the Kaohsiung-Pingtung-Penghu area of southern Taiwan. And Taiwan vice president Lai Ching-te attended the unveiling ceremony. In May 2026, the medical college generated its first cohort of graduates from the Post-Batchelor Department. The graduation ceremony was attended by the minister of education of Taiwan.

== History ==
In 2020, the National Sun Yat-sen University started the construction of its medical teaching building, for application to establish a post-bachelor medical department.

On February 9, 2022, the Ministry of Education approved the application of National Sun Yat-sen University to establish a post-bachelor medicine department. On July 18, the Ministry of Education approved the establishment of the School of Medicine at National Sun Yat-sen University.

On July 28, 2022, the National Sun Yat-sen University School of Medicine and the post-bachelor medical department were officially established, and the Institute of Biomedical Sciences, Institute of Medical Technology, Institute of Biotechnology and Pharmaceutical Sciences, Institute of Precision Medicine, and the Doctoral Degree Program and Post Bachelor Department of Clinical Medical Sciences, which were originally affiliated with the College of Science of National Sun Yat-sen University, were transferred to the School of Medicine. It is the first public university medical college in the Kaohsiung, Pingtung, and Penghu area of south Taiwan. The first dean of the College was Dr. Ming-Lung Yu. Taiwan vice president Lai Ching-te attended the unveiling ceremony of the medical college and said it was a key step for Taiwan medical education and health equality.

In August 2024, Professor Chen Yanxu assumed the position of the second dean of the medical college.

In May 2026, the medical college sent out its first cohort of graduates of the Post-Batchelor Department. They would work in rural areas in southern Taiwan after two years' general training and 3 to 6 years' specialist training. The graduation ceremony was attended by the minister of education, president of the University, and teachers and students of the medical college. In June of the same year, Professor Xu Boqin assumed the position of the third dean.

== Affiliated Units ==
=== Departments ===
There are four school and departments.

- School of Medicine (founded in 2022)
- Department of Nursing (2025)
- Department of Biomedical Science and Technology (2024)
- Doctor of Clinical and Experimental Medicine. (2022)

=== Institutes ===
The institutes include:

- Institute of Biomedical Sciences
- Institute of Medical Sciences and Technology
- Institute of Biopharmaceutical Sciences
- Institute of Precision Medicine.

=== Research Centers ===
There are two centers

- Center for Medical Education and Humanistic Development, (2022)
- Maxwell Volunteer Medical Team. (2022)

== Teaching Hospitals ==
The National Sun Yat-sen University School of Medicine primarily uses Kaohsiung Veterans General Hospital, Kaohsiung Chang Gung Memorial Hospital, Chi Mei Hospital, and Kaohsiung Medical University Chung-Ho Memorial Hospital as its teaching hospitals. Meanwhile, the following hospitals are cooperating teaching hospitals: Kaohsiung Municipal Hospital, Datong Hospital, Minsheng Hospital, Kai-Shuan Hospital, Xiaogang Hospital, Fengshan Hospital, etc.; Pingtung Hospital, Taitung Hospital, Penghu Hospital, Qishan Hospital, and Yuli Hospital under the Ministry of Health and Welfare; Kaohsiung Armed Forces General Hospital and the Penghu Branch of the Tri-Service General Hospital of the National Defense Medical Center.

The college has established a bodily donation center, which began receiving bodily donations in 2023. In the early stages, it also collaborated with Tzu Chi University on the "Silent Mentorship" program.

== Other information ==
The current location of the National Sun Yat-sen University School of Medicine is the Library and Information Building of the National Sun Yat-sen University main campus. The college is planned to be located onto the Renwu Campus, which is still under construction. In the early stages, four buildings were constructed, including the Medical Teaching Building, the Medical Research Building, the Da Ai Building (Anatomy Laboratory Building), and dormitories and restaurants for faculty and students. The construction funds were donated by alumni. Due to the suspected discovery of a prehistoric site during construction, cultural and historical experts recommended a temporary halt to construction. Later, the Kaohsiung City Cultural Affairs Bureau determined that there was no prehistoric site and that the project would not affect the preservation of cultural assets, thus approving the environmental impact assessment.

In 2024, the original campus of the International Business and Industrial Vocational College in Lingya District, Kaohsiung City, was also converted for the college's use.

Contact Address: College of Medicine, National Sun Yat-sen University, No. 70, Lienhai Road., Kaohsiung 80424, Taiwan.

== See also ==
- National Sun Yat-sen University
- Chung Shan Medical University
- Zhongshan School of Medicine, Sun Yat-sen University
- List of medical schools in Taiwan
