= College of Life Sciences and Medicine, NTHU =

Public medical school in Hsinchu City, Taiwan

College of Life Sciences and Medicine, National Tsing Hua University
- 國立清華大學生命科學暨醫學院
- Type: Public
- Established: 1992
- Affiliations: National Tsing Hua University
- Dean: Ruey-ho Kao
- Location: No. 101, Section 2, Guangfu Rd., East District, Hsinchu City, Republic of China
- Website: cls.site.nthu.edu.tw

Chinese name
- Simplified Chinese: 国立清华大学生命科学暨医学院
- Traditional Chinese: 國立清華大學生命科學暨醫學院
Transcriptions
Standard Mandarin
- Hanyu Pinyin: Guólì Qīnghuá Dàxué Shēngmìng Kēxué jì Yīxué Yuàn

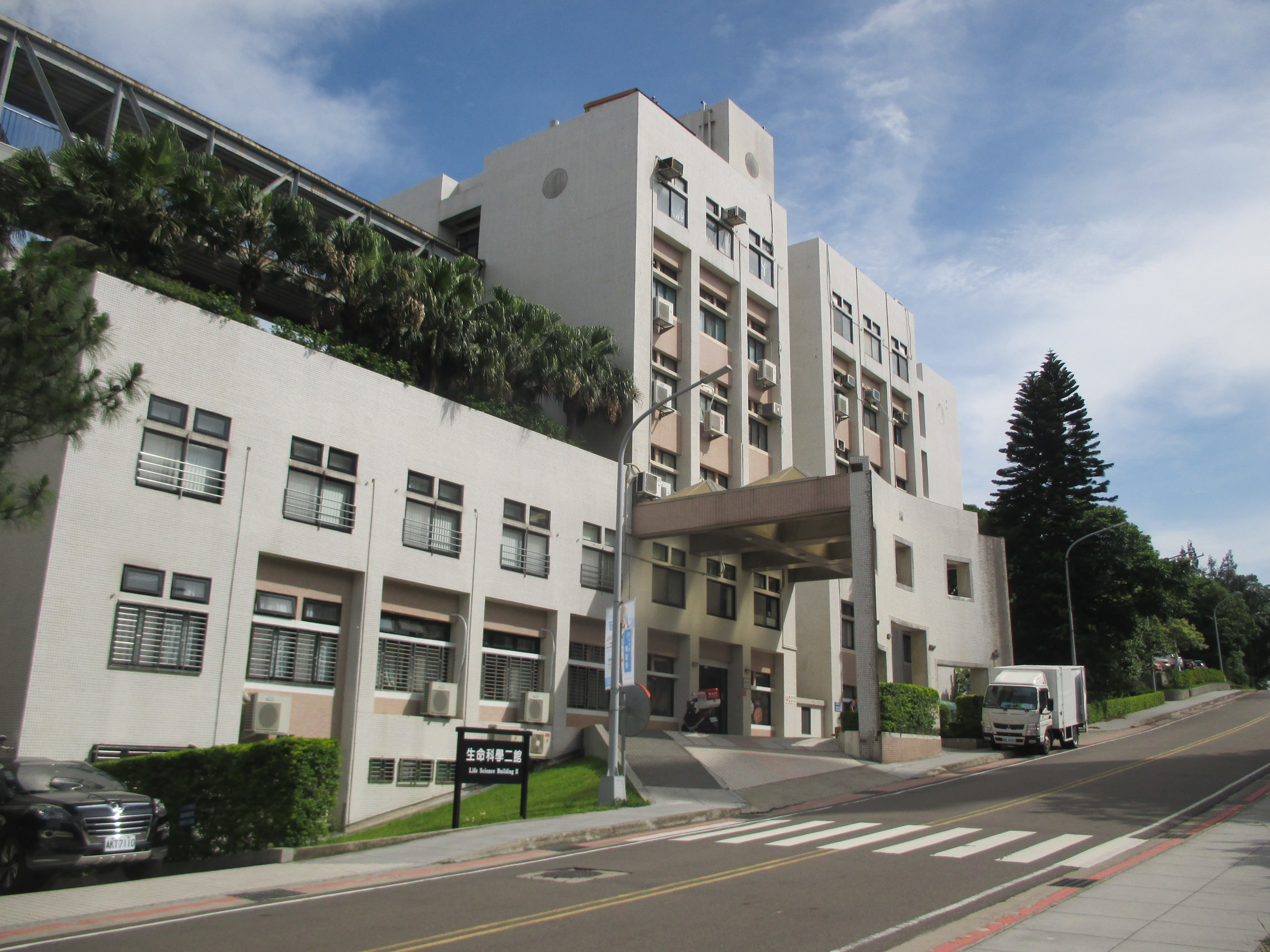
Exterior of the School of Life Sciences

The College of Life Sciences and Medicine, NTHU is a college of National Tsing Hua University (NTHU) in Hsinchu City, Taiwan. It was established in 1992, named "College of Life Sciences, NTHU", as the first college of life sciences among all Taiwan universities. In 2023, after the founding of a post baccalaureate program in medicine, the college was renamed the "College of Life Sciences and Medicine, NTHU", again the first college of its type in Taiwan. The post baccalaureate program in medicine is a 4-year program for Batchelor degree graduates of other disciplines. The students come from Taiwan and abroad.

== History ==
In 1973, National Tsing Hua University (NTHU) established the "Institute of Molecular Biology," which officially began enrolling postgraduate students the following year. In 1985, the institute was expanded and renamed the "Institute of Life Sciences."

In 1991, the "Department of Life Sciences" and the "Institute of Biomedical Sciences" were established.In 1992, the "College of Life Sciences of National Tsinghua University" was formally established. It was the first college of life sciences in Taiwan. In 1998, the former "Institute of Radiation Biology" of the university merged in.

In 2008, the "Institute of Systems Neuroscience" and the "Bachelor Program of the College of Life Sciences" were established. In 2010, the "Department of Medical Sciences" was established. In 2021, the "Post-baccalaureate program in medicine" was approved by the Ministry of Education. In 2022, the first class of students were enrolled.

In 2023, the "College of Life Sciences" was renamed the "College of Life Sciences and Medicine", the first college of sciences and medicine in Taiwan. The original "Bachelor's program in the College of Life Sciences" was renamed the "Bachelor's Program in the College of Life Sciences and Medicine". The college also plans to establish new departments of public health, nursing, and information medicine. In August 2025, the "Master of Medical Informatics Program" was established.

== Other information ==
As of July 2025, the College of Life Sciences and Medicine comprises 5 research institutes, 2 PhD programs, 1 Master program, 3 departments, 1 bachelor's degree program.

The post baccalaureate program in medicine of the college is a 4-year program for graduates of other disciplines who have excellent academic performance and a passion for medical service. Students come from Taiwan and abroad, and with Bachelor degrees in pharmacy, nursing, biology, chemistry, electronic engineering and psychology; and even with practice licenses for Traditional Chinese Medicine.

== See also ==
- National Tsing Hua University
- List of medical schools in Taiwan
