= List of medical schools in Taiwan =

This is a list of universities in Taiwan, grouped by institutional type, including comprehensive universities and medical-based universities.

== Comprehensive Universities ==
Name	Abbr.	Chinese name	Founded	Location
National Taiwan University	NTU	國立臺灣大學	1928	Da'an District, Taipei
National Cheng Kung University	NCKU	國立成功大學	1931	East District, Tainan
Fu Jen Catholic University	FJU	天主教輔仁大學	1925	Xinzhuang District, New Taipei
I-Shou University	ISU	義守大學	1986	Yanchao District, Kaohsiung
National Tsing Hua University	NTHU	清華大學	1911	East District, Hsinchu
National Sun Yat-sen University	NSYSU	中山大學	1924	Renwu District, Kaohsiung
National Chung Hsing University	NCHU	中興大學	1919	South District, Taichung

== Medical-based Universities ==
Name	Abbr.	Chinese name	Founded	Location
National Yang Ming Chiao Tung University	NYCU	國立陽明交通大學	2021	Beitou District, Taipei
National Defense Medical Center	NDMC	國防醫學院	1902	Neihu District, Taipei
Chang Gung University	CGU	長庚大學	1987	Guishan District, Taoyuan
Taipei Medical University	TMU	臺北醫學大學	1960	Xinyi District, Taipei
Kaohsiung Medical University	KMU	高雄醫學大學	1953	Sanmin District, Kaohsiung
China Medical University	CMU	中國醫藥大學	1958	North District, Taichung
Tzu Chi University	TCU	慈濟大學	1994	Hualien City, Hualien County
Chung Shan Medical University	CSMU	中山醫學大學	1960	South District, Taichung
Mackay Medical College	MMC	馬偕醫學院	2009	Sanzhi District, New Taipei
