= National Cheng Kung University College of Medicine =

The National Cheng Kung University College of Medicine (Chinese: 國立成功大學醫學院), or "College of Medicine, NCKU", is the medical school of National Cheng Kung University (NCKU) in Tainan City, Taiwan. Founded in 1984, the college is now a top medical school in Taiwan.

== History ==
In 1984, the National Cheng Kung University College of Medicine was founded, headed by Dr. Kun-Yen Huang. It offered the program Doctor of Medicine (M.D.), which only admitted students with batcher degrees for a further study period of five years.

In 1988, the National Cheng Kung University Hospital was opened.

In 1994, due to lack of diversities of the students, the post-bachelor program was ended. A new Doctor of Medicine (M.D.) program was founded to recruit students from high school graduates, for a period of seven-year medical study.

In 2013, another Doctor of Medicine (M.D.) program was founded, also for secondary school graduates. The period of study is six years.

In 2019, the seven-year program Doctor of Medicine (M.D.) was closed.

In August, 2023, the College of Medicine celebrated its 40th anniversary with the inauguration of the "Biomedical Excellence Building", built over five years at a cost of NT$840 millions. A "40th Anniversary Commemorative Column" was erected in the atrium. The building houses the only world-class comparative medicine center in Taiwan, and six major research areas, including the Chia-Cheng Geriatric Medicine Research Center, the Cell Therapy and Regenerative Medicine Center, and the Innovative Medical Devices and Diagnostic Medicine Platform. There are eleven floors above ground and two floors below ground.

== Programs ==
Currently the college offers a number of bachelor, master and PhD programs, including:

- Doctor of Medicine (M.D), six years. Students are admitted from secondary school graduates.

Normally, the program degrees awarded by this college is acceptable in Canada and the United States.

== National Cheng Kung University Hospital ==
The National Cheng Kung University Hospital is an affiliated hospital of the medical College. Formally opened in 1988, the hospital is now the largest hospital in Tainan. There are more than 1,200 patient beds.

== Other information ==
The college medical library has a collection of 119,819 volumes, in addition to periodicals, e-books and other non-printed materials.

In the "QS World University Rankings by Subject: Medicine 2026", National Cheng Kung University ranks 2nd in Taiwan.

College Address: No.1, University Road, Tainan City, Taiwan

== See also ==
- National Cheng Kung University
- National Cheng Kung University Hospital
- List of medical schools in Taiwan
