= Qigong (artist) =

Chinese artist and art historian (1912–2005)

- Born: 26 July 1912; Beijing, Republic of China
- Died: 30 June 2005 (aged 92); Beijing, People's Republic of China
- Spouse: Zhang Baochen (m. 1932–1975)
- Mother: Ke Lianzhen (died 1957)
- Occupation: Calligrapher

Qigong (Chinese: 启功, courtesy name Yuanbai 元白, alternatively Qi Gong) (July 26, 1912 – June 30, 2005) was a renowned Chinese calligrapher, artist, painter, connoisseur and sinologist. He was an advisor for the September 3 Society, one of China's minor political parties.

Qigong was born into a Manchu family in Beijing in 1912. Both his great-grandfather and grandfather were Jinshi, the highest Chinese academic title roughly equivalent to a doctoral. He was a descendant of the Yongzheng Emperor through his son Hongzhou, and therefore a member of the Aisin Gioro imperial clan. Upon coming to prominence, he declined to use both the Manchu "Aisin Gioro" or sinicized Jin surname, and went by the legal surname of "Qi" to establish a name for himself removed from that of the Imperial family.

== Name and ancestry ==
Qi belonged to the Aisin Gioro clan, the Manchu rulers of the Qing dynasty in China. The character of Qi (启) used in Qigong's name was a generation name of the ruling Aisin-Gioro clan as dictated by the Qing Imperial Family during the time of the Xianfeng Emperor. It is possible from this code to discern that Qigong was the 10th Generation descendant of the Yongzheng Emperor, his direct ancestor. Qigong, however, has never used the regal family name to sign any of his calligraphy, paintings, letters, or articles. By refusing the noble surname, Qi wanted to show his resolutions to make a living by himself instead of depending on his noble ancestors. He once responded, tongue-in-cheek, "My surname is Qi and given name is Gong. I do not take from my ancestors, nor do I associate with any 'Eight Banners' brotherhood. I rely on my own ability to make a living." Qi's father died at the age of 19, when Qi was just two years old.

Qigong was legally known as "Qi Gong" with "Qi" being his legal surname, but many still regard Qigong as a name in singularity. Therefore, in the English transcriptions of his name he can be variably called "Qigong" or "Qi Gong".

His style name (zi) was Yuanbai.

== Biography ==
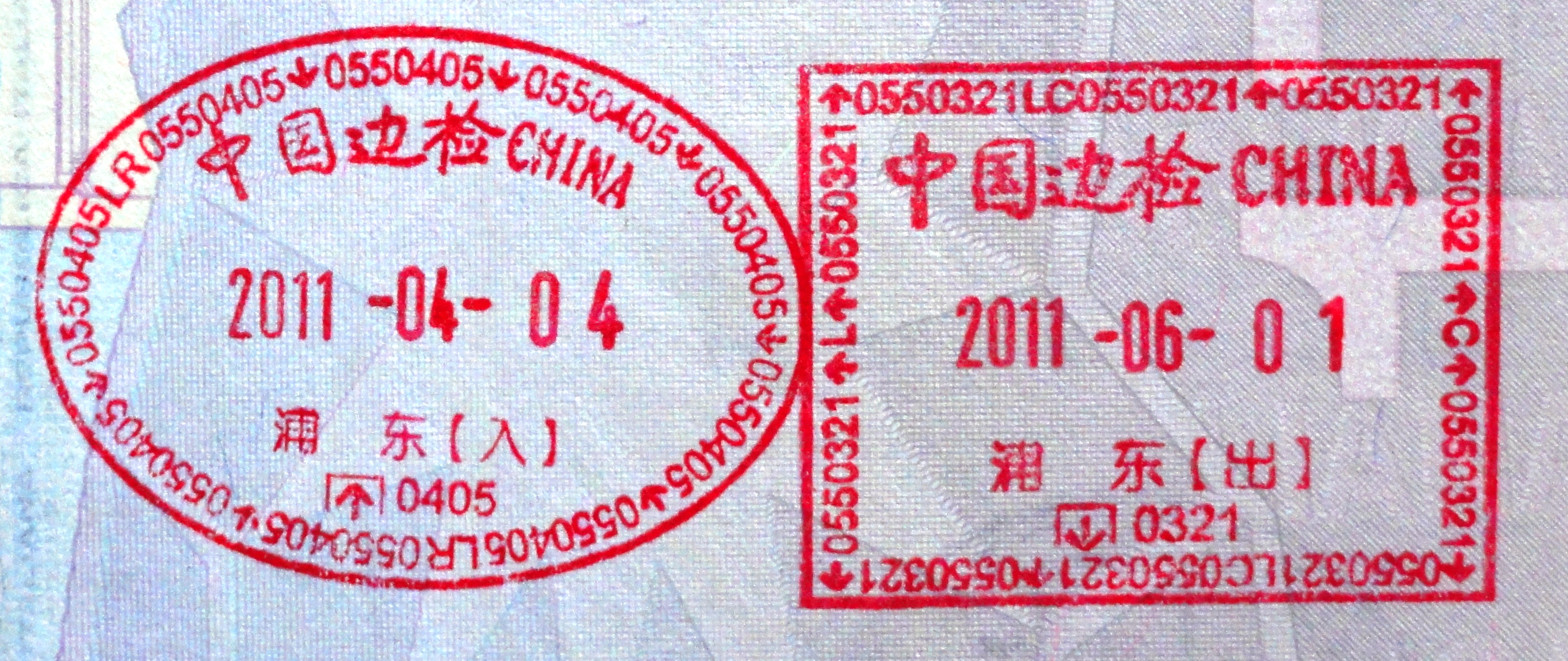
China Entry and Exit Stamp, with the agency name "China Immigration Inspection" written by Qigong

He grew up in extreme poverty and was forced to drop out of middle school while still a teenager. He continued to pursue his love of art and knowledge and managed to become a private student of leading scholars and painters. To support his family and buy books, he often had to sell his paintings and work as a tutor.

Initially Qi Gong was better known as a painter than a calligrapher. In 1935, he began work as a teaching assistant at Fujen University in Beijing, which later became Beijing Normal University. He continued teaching Chinese classics and literature at the university and also taught the study of traditional Chinese antiques at Peking University. He tutored Master's and PhD students until a few years before his death.

He learned Chinese calligraphy in his childhood, and studied various historical stone inscriptions of calligraphy in detail. He was deft in merging the characteristics of different eras and authors, and versatile in all the writing styles, especially the regular script (kaishu), the running hand (xingshu), and the cursive script (caoshu) styles. His style embodies the essence of great classical calligraphers like Wang Xizhi and Wang Xianzhi, yet unique in its own way. He was also a learned scholar in the areas of Chinese ancient song lyrics, phonology, semantics, and Dream of the Red Chamber study, and published extensively in these fields. He was also very versatile in poetry writing and appreciation, and used his own poems in his calligraphy extensively.

He also began to develop the eye of an art connoisseur by frequenting the Forbidden City, the imperial palace of Qing Dynasty. He authenticated, salvaged, and preserved abundant rare and valuable cultural relics for the country. He established himself internationally by attending various influential treasure-authenticating events and international academic conferences in countries such as Japan, Singapore, the United States, South Korea, Britain, and France, promoting international cultural exchanges. Qi Gong passed what he had learned from Chen Yuan, as well as his own selfless love, on to his generations of students. Qi Gong set up the Li Yun Grant in 1990 with 1.63 million yuan (US$196.904) of his own money, money raised at a sale of work in Hong Kong during which he sold out more than a hundred painting and calligraphic works of his own.

For nearly 30 years, Qi was so busy working as a college teacher that he almost totally abandoned painting and focused on calligraphy in his spare time. It was not until the 1980s that he again picked up a paintbrush. As a renowned artist, Qi Gong served as vice-chairman and later chairman of the Chinese Calligraphers' Association. An outstanding connoisseur of Chinese calligraphy and painting, he worked as director of the National Relics Evaluation Committee.

Qi had lived alone in his home and studio on the university campus since his wife Zhang Baochen died in 1975. The couple had no children.

== Final years ==
Even though Qi Gong has remained the best-known calligrapher in the public's eye. Since 1999, Qi Gong also headed the Central Research Institute of Chinese History. The institute currently has 29 members, all leaders in their fields of history, the humanities and the arts.

Despite the fact that he also chaired the Chinese Calligraphers' Association and served as a senior scholar on a team of national experts on cultural relics, Qi Gong was always unassuming, both among his peers and towards other artists. Before his death in 2005, he was the honorary president of Chinese Calligraphers' Association, director of Cultural Relic Authentication Committee of the State Council, professor of Beijing Normal University, and member of the National Committee of the Chinese People's Political Consultative Conference.

At Beijing Normal University, where Qi Gong taught classical Chinese language and literature for more than 60 years, teachers and students mourned their professor's death. Qi Gong's death was also met with sadness by the public, and has been especially felt by the country's artists, calligraphers, and art collectors.

== Marriage ==
Qi's marriage was arranged by his mother within the clan according to Qing Dynasty tradition. He married Zhang Baochen (1910–1975), a woman he had never met before, at the age of 21. With a lifestyle far removed from Qi, Zhang knew little about calligraphy or painting. She also brought to the family her little brother. Zhang devoted herself to the family. When Qi's mother died in 1957, a grateful Qi kneeled down before her to express his gratitude. Qi was labeled as a "rightist" in Mao's Anti-Rightist Movement in 1957, and became depressed. Zhang encouraged her husband to keep on working and sold her jewelry to buy books for Qi. During the Cultural Revolution (1966–76), Qi was arrested because of his noble family background and was forced to surrender his family's belongings. Zhang had packaged all Qi's works and collections and managed to keep them away hidden. The Red Guards searched their house several times to no avail. Zhang revealed the locations of the manuscripts to Qi before she died, and Qi later retrieved the pieces, which had been well covered in sheets of kraft paper.

== Family ==
- Yongzheng Emperor
  - Hongzhou, Prince Hegong of the First Rank
    - Yongbi, Prince Heqin of the First Rank
      - Mingxun, Prince Heke of the Second Rank
        - Yihang, Beili
          - Zaichong
            - Puliang 溥良 (died in 1922)
              - Yulong 毓隆 (died in 1923)
                - Hengtong (died in 1913) = Ke Lianzhen 克连珍 (died in 1957)
                  - Qigong = Zhang Baochen 章宝琛 (1910–1975)
                - Heng Guihua 恒季华 (died in 1957)
- Relative: Puru (1896–1963)

== See also ==
- New Culture Movement
- Fu Jen School
- Fu Jen Catholic University
- Beijing Normal University
