= Repatriation of Bunun remains at National Taiwan University =

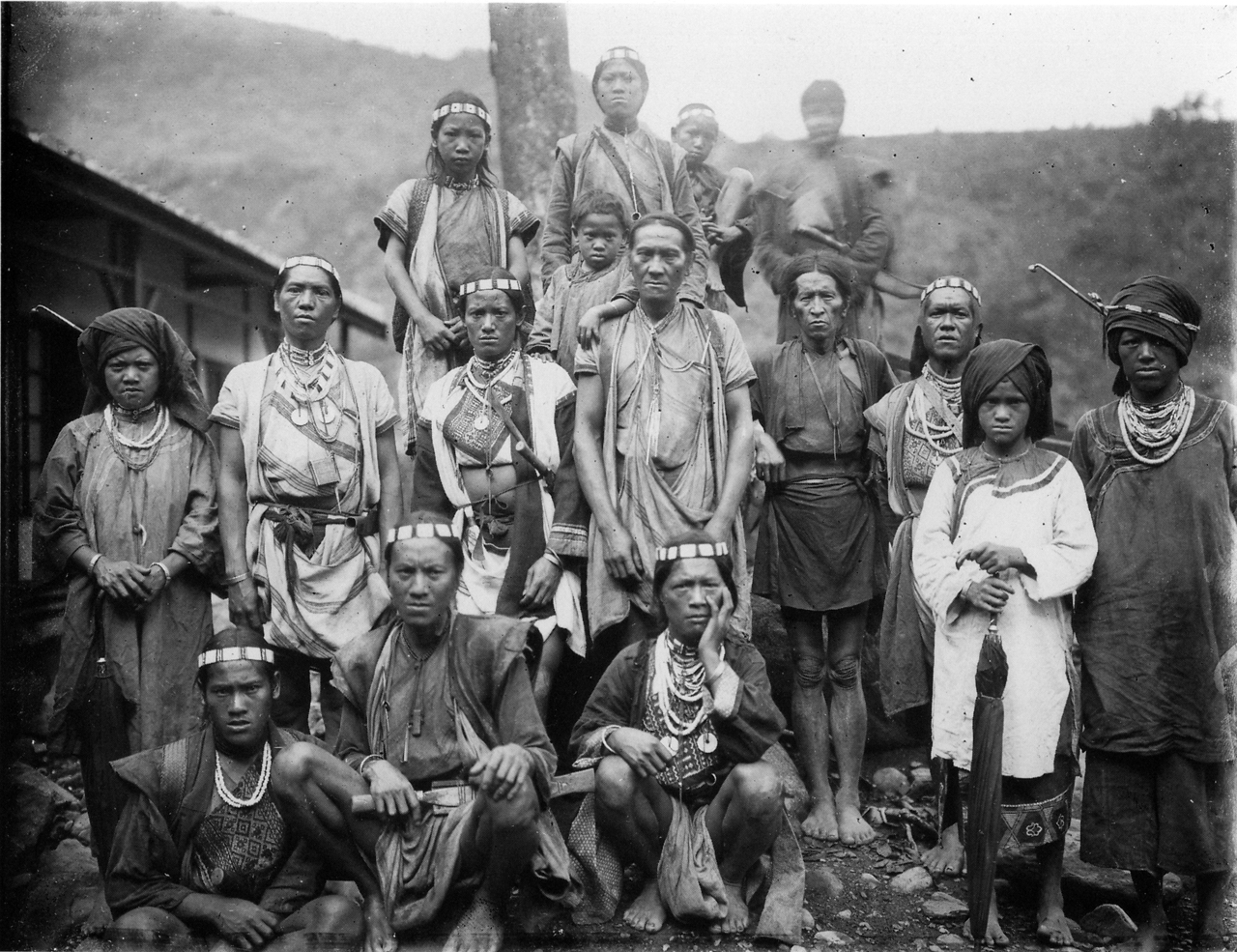
Bunun people, photographed by Japanese anthropologist Torii Ryūzō in 1900.

The repatriation of Bunun remains at National Taiwan University refers to a dispute between the Bunun Mayuan Village (Bunun: Damayan, Chinese: 馬遠部落, and Japanese: 馬遠村) and National Taiwan University (NTU) over the return of ancestral remains.

In 1960, a research team from NTU's College of Medicine excavated human remains from the Damayan Tribe cemetery in Wanrong, Hualien County, without the consent of the families, and transported them to the university's laboratory for academic study.

In 2017, the Damayan Tribe formed a self-help association and petitioned in Taipei for the return of their ancestral remains. NTU gave a verbal promise but failed to deliver. On November 15, 2023, the group staged another protest at NTU, calling for public attention.

== Background ==
=== Policy of forced relocation ===
Wanrong Township, Hualien County in Taiwan

In 1930, during the period of Japanese colonial rule in Taiwan, the Musha Incident (Chinese: 霧社事件), an uprising by the Seediq people, in the mountainous regions, prompted the Government-General of Taiwan to revise its policies toward highland Indigenous tribes. On December 28, 1931, the Government-General issued the "Outline of Indigenous Policy" (Japanese: 理蕃政策大綱), which made the forced relocation of highland Indigenous groups to foothill areas an official objective. As a result, large numbers of Indigenous peoples were compelled to leave their lands and resettle in the lowlands.

The Bunun people are one of the Taiwanese indigenous peoples. The Dan Group of Bunun, who originally lived in the upper reaches of the Danta River (丹大溪, Aul misnavatan by the Bunun) in Taichū Prefecture (present-day in parts of Nantou County), were relocated under this policy to Mahuan (Japanese: マホワン社, Bunun: Damayan), located in Karenkō Prefecture (present-day Ma-yuan Village / 馬遠村 in Wanrong Township, Hualien County). Another smaller part of the same group was moved to Tamazuan (Chinese: 達瑪巒, present-day Dili Village / 地利村, Xinyi Township, Nantou County). The relocation to Mahuan / Damayan was largely completed by around 1935, and the Japanese government established a cemetery there, which subsequently became the final resting place of those resettled.

=== Japanese tradition of physical anthropology ===
The Medical Faculty of Taihoku Imperial University was established during the period of Japanese colonial rule, and after World War II, it was renamed National Taiwan University College of Medicine by the Taiwanese government. In its research, it continued the academic traditions of Japanese medicine, one of which was the collection of human remains from various peoples around the world for use in anatomical or physical anthropology instruction, as well as for scholarly research.

After World War II, a large number of Japanese people were repatriated, but Professor Takeo Kanaseki (金関丈夫, 1897-1983), a noted anatomist who taught at the College of Medicine at NTU, was permitted to remain. As a result, certain academic traditions from the Japanese era at the College of Medicine were preserved and passed down.

From the mid-1930s, Kanaseki began extensively collecting human remains from cemeteries across Taiwan. In the early postwar years, anatomical instruction and physical anthropology research at the NTU's College of Medicine, were largely directed by Kanaseki. In 1949, Kanaseki returned to Japan to assume a professorship at Kyushu University, but maintained academic ties with NTU’s College of Medicine. Between the 1940s and 1960s, Kanaseki continued to support several physicians who had previously served as assistants in the anatomy laboratory in Taiwan, such as Tsai Chin-kuei (蔡錦圭), helping them publish numerous studies in physical anthropology, and in some cases even obtain doctoral degrees in medicine in Japan.

Takeo Kanaseki’s legacy has become increasingly controversial in recent years. He has been accused of acquiring Ryukyuan human remains through improper means while serving on Kyoto Imperial University (now Kyoto University), particularly from the Mumujana-baka tomb (Ryukyuan languages:ムムジャナバカ, 百按司墓) in Okinawa Prefecture.

== Excavation of remains ==
=== Control Yuan's Investigation ===
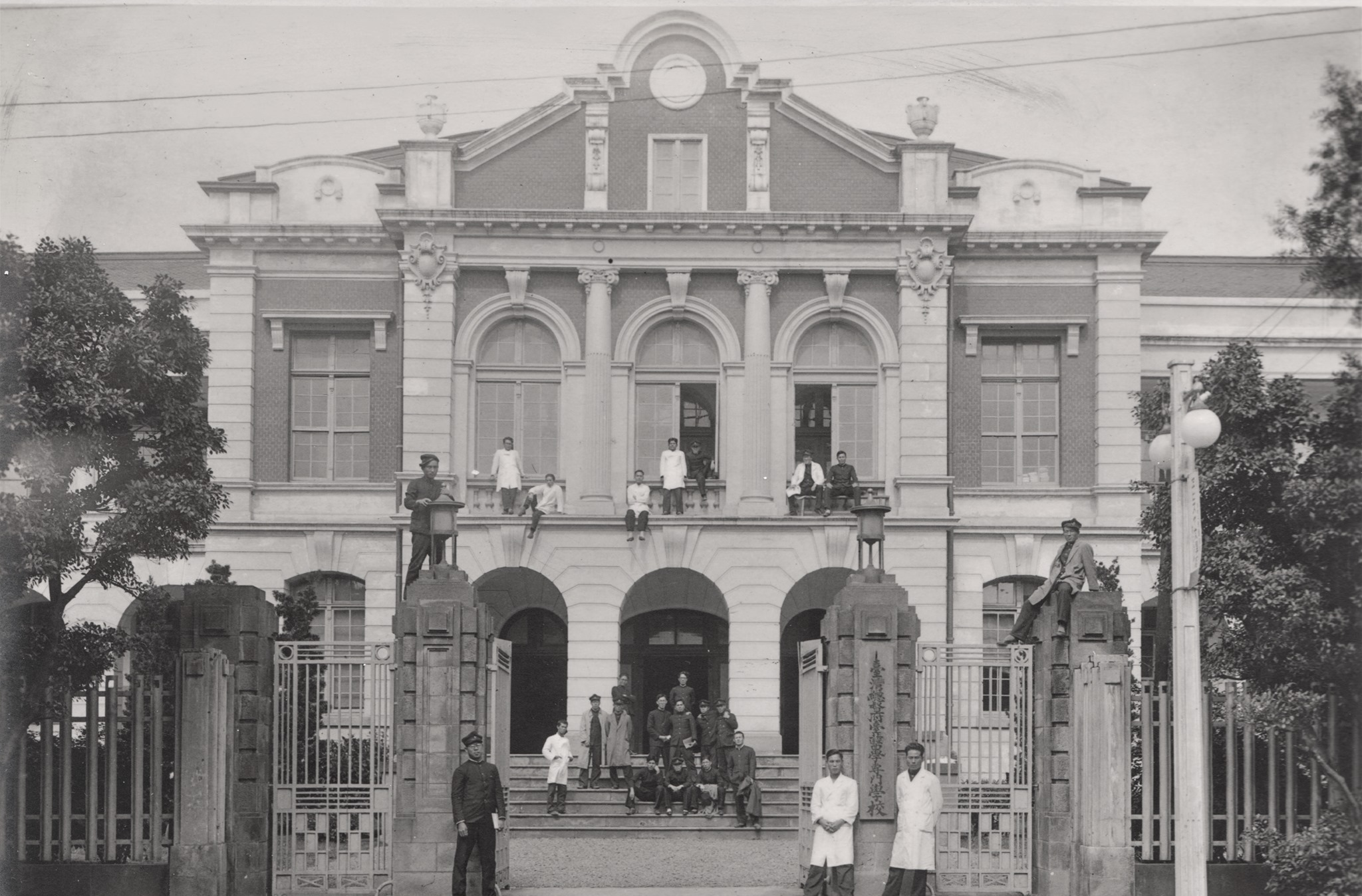
Taiwan Governor-General's Office Taipei Medical College in 1930's. (present day is NTU College of Medicine )

In 2018, Control Yuan launched an investigation into the case. The investigation report cited a 1961 manuscript by NTU's College of Medicine assistant instructor Chang Ping-lung (張丙龍), and his 1962 paper Anthropological Studies on the Tibia and Fibula of the Bunun in Taiwan.

The paper mentioned that in 1957, Professor Yu Chin-chuan (余錦泉), then chair of the Department of Anatomy, led Associate Professor Lin Huai-san (林槐三), Lecturer Tseng Tsong-ming (鄭聰明), Assistant Instructor Chen I-li (陳以理), and Chang Ping-lung to the Damayan Tribe of the Bunun people in Mayuan Village to conduct anthropological fieldwork. Under the pretext of academic research, they sought permission from the village head, Lin Ching-shui (林清水), to excavate ancestral remains. According to the account, at the time the villagers were holding a community meeting on public sanitation issues, during which police officer Chen Ching-lin (陳慶霖) of the Mayuan Police Station proposed the excavation. The proposal was reportedly approved unanimously at the meeting.

In August 1960, Chang Ping-Lung formally wrote to Chen Ching-lin (by then reassigned to the Lihua Police Station under the Fenglin Precinct) and to village officer Chang Tzu-yuan (張紫淵), requesting that they seek authorization from Lin Ching-shui, then township head of Wanrong (and former Mayuan village head). In September, Chang Ping-lung returned to Mayuan Village, hired several workers, and, with the assistance of then-village head Ma Lien-sheng (馬連勝), excavated 60 sets of human remains, which were transported by truck to the Department of Anatomy at NTU’s College of Medicine.

These remains, later referred to as the “Mayuan Remains,” became the most complete collection of Bunun skeletal specimens in the world. Between 1961 and 2014, a total of 14 academic papers were published based on the Mayuan Remains, all within the field of physical anthropology.

=== Controversy ===
In 1945, Japanese control of Taiwan and the Penghu Islands ended with its defeat in World War II. In 1949, martial law was imposed across Taiwan by the Nationalist government, instituting strict authoritarian control that lasted until its lifting in 1987.

According to a manuscript by NTU researcher Chang Ping-lung, the excavation of ancestral remains in Mayuan (Damayan) was said to have been carried out with the villagers' consent. However, the Control Yuan investigation report found no documentation sufficient to prove that the Damayan persons had ever agreed to the actions of the NTU team.

Elders of the Damayan recalled in interviews that NTU never consulted with the whole tribe regarding the excavation, and that the act gravely violated Bunun cultural taboos. In Bunun belief, disturbing ancestral remains is equivalent to disrupting the peace of the deceased. However, the Damayan tribe did not dare to oppose state authorities in the 1960s, and witnesses at the time were reluctant to speak about the incident. Over the years, the matter gradually faded into obscurity, with fewer and fewer people retaining knowledge of what had taken place.

== Repatriation efforts ==
In September 2012, the NTU Alumni Bimonthly No. 83 published an article titled "The Laboratory of Physical Anthropology 〈體質人類學研究室〉" by scholar Tsai Chin-kuei (蔡錦圭). The article mentioned that ancestral remains from the Mayuan (Damayan) Bunun tribe had once been used for academic research at the university. A graduate student concerned with Indigenous issues came across the piece and shared it online, sparking discussion. This drew the attention of Bunun scholar Tunkan Tansikian (陳張培倫) and other Indigenous organizations. It was only then that the younger generation of the Damayan tribe learned that their ancestors’ remains had been kept in the NTU's College of Medicine, leading to widespread debate and concern.

In 2017, the Damayan tribe formed a "Self-Help Association" and visited the specimen room of NTU’s College of Medicine to view the ancestral remains. After internal discussions, the association reached a consensus and presented seven demands to National Taiwan University:

1. NTU must issue a public apology.
2. Immediate protective measures must be taken for the 64 sets of remains from the Damayan tribe.
3. The government of the Republic of China (ROC) should provide compensation to the Damayan tribe.
4. The ROC government should establish a memorial hall and monument for the remains in the Damayan tribe.
5. NTU must return the 64 sets of remains.
6. NTU should hold a formal repatriation ceremony.
7. NTU, on behalf of the ROC government, should conduct a reconciliation ceremony with the community.

On July 12, 2018, as NTU continued to delay the repatriation of the Damayan ancestral remains, the Control Yuan issued a formal notice urging the university to proceed without further delay.

Between 2020 and 2023, negotiations between the Damayan Tribe Task Force and National Taiwan University failed to reach any resolution. Despite coordination efforts involving the Executive Yuan, the Ministry of Education, and the Council of Indigenous Peoples, no consensus was achieved, and the talks remained at an impasse.

On November 3, 2023, the University of Edinburgh in the United Kingdom repatriated the remains of Paiwan people who had died in the Mudan incident back to Taiwan. Inspired by this, the Damayan Task Force once again mobilized the community on November 15, marching north to Taipei. They circled past the Executive Yuan, the Ministry of Education, and the NTU College of Medicine, before arriving at the main gate of NTU’s campus to press their demands. They hoped that NTU President Chen Wen-chang (陳文章) would personally accept their petition, in which case they were prepared to disband the protest. However, the demonstration coincided with NTU’s 95th anniversary celebration, and the university only sent its Chief Secretary as a representative. The community members were ultimately barred by police from entering through the university’s main gate.

== As an example of transitional justice ==
Yuan-chao Tung (童元昭), an anthropologist at NTU’s College of Liberal Arts, argues that this incident is not an isolated case. Traditions of academic research involving the collection of human remains and racial studies often relied on researchers’ long-term cooperation with bureaucracies, the military, and police authorities to obtain ancestral remains. The scientific racism and ethical controversies embedded in such practices have been recurring patterns throughout colonial history.

Tunkan Tansikian (陳張培倫), an ethnologist at National Dong Hwa University, likewise stresses that similar incidents involving the removal of ancestral remains is not confined to a single village or ethnic group. In earlier decades, government agencies operating under authoritarian structures often acted expediently. Beyond NTU, other institutions were also involved in the improper acquisition of Indigenous cultural artifacts and human remains. Therefore, the question of reparations for victims should not be limited to one university taking overall responsibility. Instead, the case highlights issues of transitional justice at the national level: government agencies must not only step forward but also look to international precedents to establish legal frameworks for repatriation and compensation.
