= John Ning-Yuean Lee =

Taiwanese biologist

- 李寧遠

7th President of Fu Jen Catholic University
- In office 2000–2004
- Preceded by: Tuen-Ho Yang
- Succeeded by: Bernard Li

Personal details
- Born: 2 September 1945 (age 80) Taiwan
- Education: National Taiwan University (BA, MA, PhD)

Chinese name
- Traditional Chinese: 李寧遠
- Simplified Chinese: 李宁遠
Transcriptions
Standard Mandarin
- Hanyu Pinyin: Lǐ Níngyuǎn
- Bopomofo: ㄌㄧˇ ㄋㄧㄥˊ ㄩㄢˇ
- Gwoyeu Romatzyh: Lii Ning-yeuan
- Wade–Giles: Li^{3} Ning^{2}-yüan^{3}
Southern Min
- Hokkien POJ: Lí Lêng-hn̄g
- Tâi-lô: Lí Lîng-hn̄g

John Ning-Yuean Lee, KHS (李寧遠; Hanyu pinyin: Li Ningyuan; 2 September 1945–) is a Taiwanese biologist and former president of Fu Jen Catholic University. At present, he is the chair professor of Beijing Normal University Zhuhai campus.

He obtained the bachelor's, master's and doctoral degree at National Taiwan University. Afterward, he served as professor at the National Taiwan Sport University, the 1st dean of College of Human Ecology and university president at Fu Jen, dean of College of Living Technology at Tainan University of Technology.

== Honor ==
- Order of the Holy Sepulchre

Academic offices
Preceded by Peter Tuen-Ho Yang	President of Fu Jen Catholic University; 2000–2004	Succeeded by Bernard Li
