= Bokeh Kosang =

Taiwanese actor and singer

- Hsu Yi-fan (徐詣帆)
- Born: 26 July 1980 (age 46); Wanrong, Hualien County, Taiwan
- Education: Chinese Culture University
- Occupations: Actor; singer
- Years active: 2007–present
- Agents: Dapeng Dissemination Enterprise; Forward Music
- Notable work: Seediq Bale
- Spouse: Iyan Tsai (m. 2010)
- Children: Hagay Bokeh

Bokeh Kosang
- Traditional Chinese: 徐詣帆
- Simplified Chinese: 徐诣帆
- Hanyu Pinyin: Xú Yìfān
Transcriptions
Standard Mandarin
- Hanyu Pinyin: Xú Yìfān

Bokeh Kosang (Chinese: 徐詣帆; pinyin: Xú Yìfān, born 26 July 1980) is a Taiwanese actor and singer of Truku ethnicity.

He is noted for his roles as Hanaoka Ichiro in the film Seediq Bale, which earned him a Supporting Actor Award at the 46th Golden Bell Awards.

== Early life ==
Bokeh Kosang was born and raised in Wanrong Township of Hualien County, Taiwan. He graduated from Chinese Culture University, majoring in vocal music.

== Career ==
Bokeh Kosang first rose to prominence in 2011 for playing Hanaoka Ichiro in the film Seediq Bale. The film reached number one in the ratings when it aired in Taiwan.

== Filmography ==
=== Film ===
Year	English title	Original title	Role	Notes
2011	Seediq Bale	《賽德克·巴萊》	Hanaoka Ichiro	
2013	Baseballove	《球愛天空》	A Hou	
2014	Sex Appeal	《寒蟬》		
2015	Wawa no Cidal	《太陽的孩子》	劉聖雄	
2018	High Flash			

=== Television ===
Year	English title	Original title	Role	Notes
2011	Swaying Bamboo Forest	《飄搖的竹林》	Lin Jiusheng	
2012	The Late Night Stop	《小站》	A Tai	
2013	Boys Can Fly	《刺蝟男孩》	Zhang Mingqiang	
2013	The Pursuit of Happiness	《愛的生存之道》	Brother Wen	
2018	Iron Ladies			

== Discography ==
=== Single albums ===
- The Rainbow Promise
- MQA-RAS

== Awards and nominations ==
Year	Award	Category	Nominated work	Results
2011	46th Golden Bell Awards	Supporting Actor in Television	Swaying Bamboo Forest	Nominated
2011	48th Golden Horse Awards	Supporting Actor	Seediq Bale	Won
2011	48th Golden Horse Awards	Best New Performer	Seediq Bale	Nominated
2012	12th Chinese Film Media Awards	Best Newcomer	Seediq Bale	Nominated
