= Gabriel Chen-Ying Ly =

Taiwanese philosopher (1929–2023)

- 李振英

5th President of Fu Jen Catholic University
- In office 1992–1996
- Preceded by: Stanislaus Lo Kuang
- Succeeded by: Tuen-Ho Yang

Personal details
- Born: 4 October 1929 Tianjin, China
- Died: 18 February 2023 (aged 93)
- Education: Pontifical Urban University (MPhil, MTh); Università Cattolica del Sacro Cuore (PhD)

Gabriel Chen-Ying Ly (Chinese: 李振英; pinyin: Li Zhenying; 4 October 1929 – 18 February 2023) was a Taiwanese philosopher who was secretary-general of the Chinese Regional Bishops' Conference and president of Fu Jen Catholic University. He was a philosophy professor at Fu Jen and the National Chengchi University.

Ly died on 18 February 2023, at the age of 93.

Academic offices
Preceded by Stanislaus Lo Kuang	President of Fu Jen Catholic University; 1992–1996	Succeeded by Peter Tuen-Ho Yang
