= National Taiwan University College of Medicine =

Coordinates: 25.0398°N 121.5196°E

- 國立臺灣大學醫學院
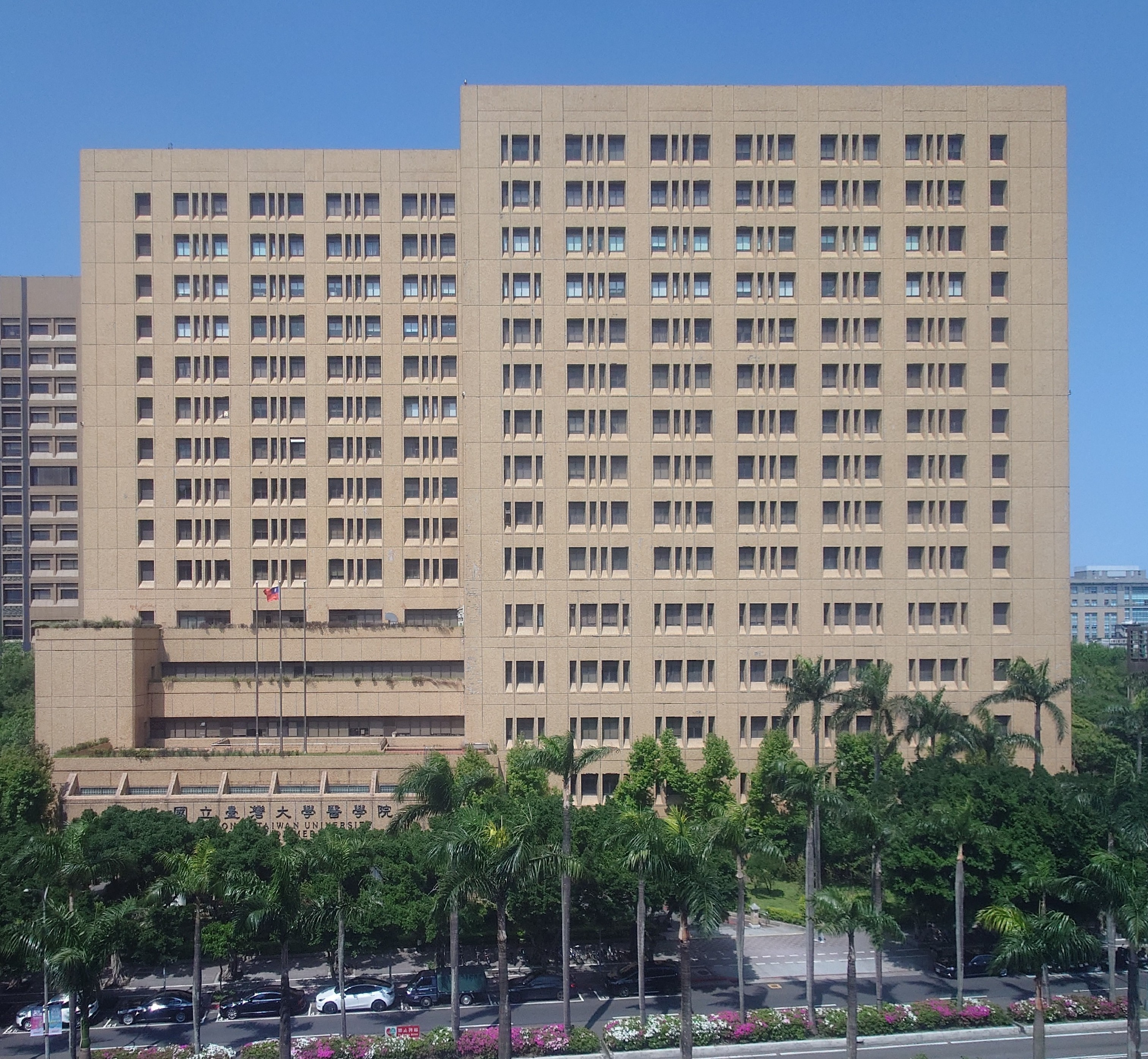
- Basic Medical Sciences Building of the College of Medicine
- Type: Medical school
- Established: 1897; 129 years ago
- Parent institution: National Taiwan University
- Dean: Ni Yanxuan (倪衍玄)
- Location: No. 1, Section 1, Ren'ai Road, Zhongzheng District, Taipei City
- Website: https://www.mc.ntu.edu.tw/ntucm/Index.action?l=en_US

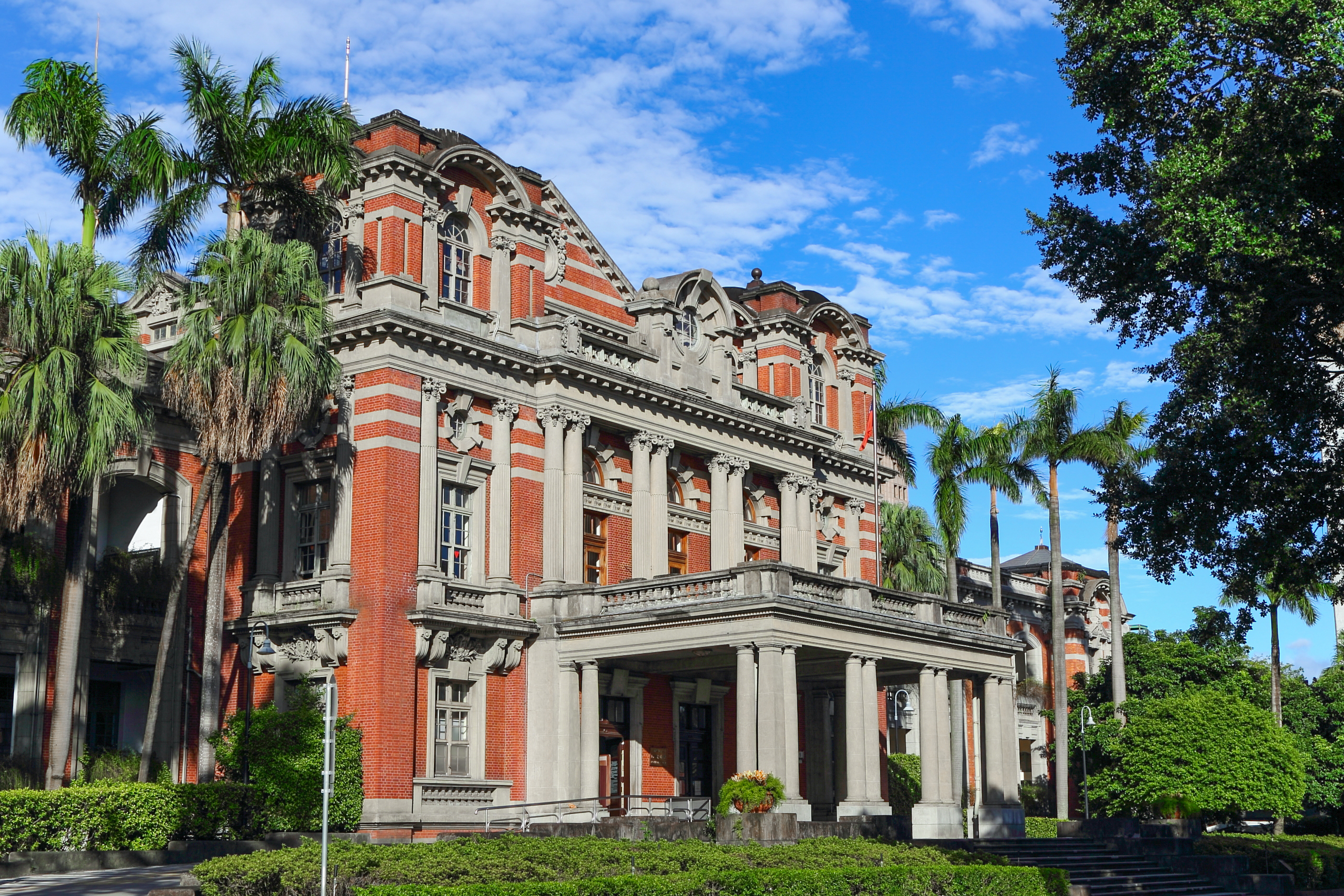
The original site of Taipei Hospital, now the west site of the National Taiwan University Medical College Hospital

The National Taiwan University College of Medicine (NTUCM; Chinese: 國立臺灣大學醫學院) is the medical school of National Taiwan University. Its predecessor can be traced back to the "Medical Training Institute" established within Taipei Hospital in 1897, making it the earliest institution to offer modern medical education in Taiwan. The affiliated Taipei Hospital of NTUCM is the largest public hospital in Taiwan, with branches throughout the island.

== History ==
=== Japanese colonial period ===
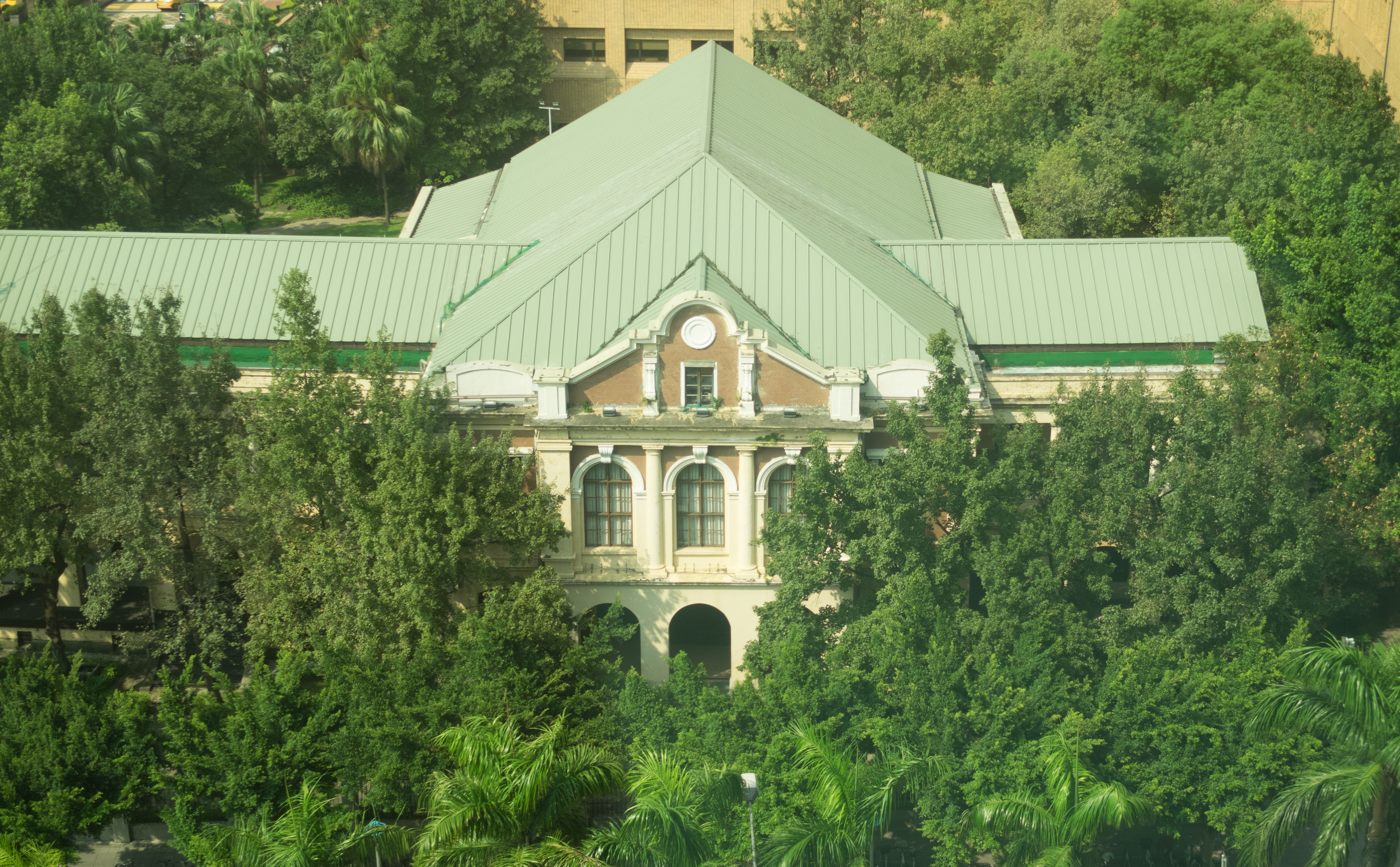
The original site of the Taiwan Governor-General's Office Medical School was occupied by the National Taiwan University College of Medicine after the war. Now the National Taiwan University Museum of Medical Humanities

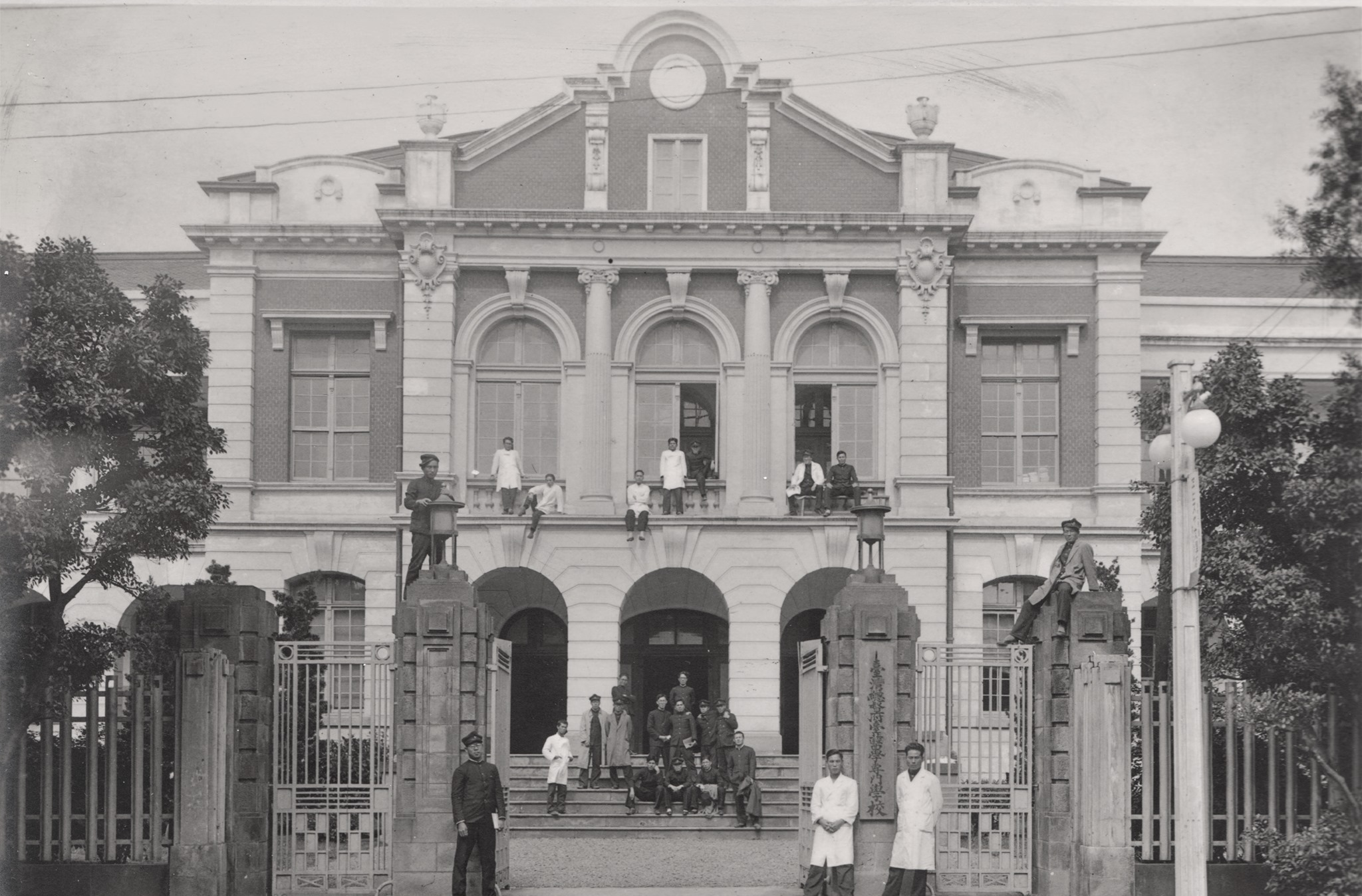
Taiwan Governor-General's Office Taipei Medical College

On June 18, 1895, the Japanese established the "Great Japan Taiwan Hospital" (the predecessor of the current National Taiwan University Medical School Hospital) in Dadaocheng (now Guide Street in Taipei City). In April 1896, the hospital was renamed the "Taipei Hospital".

In May 1897, the hospital was renamed the "Taiwan Governor-General's Taipei Hospital". In July of the same year, the Taipei Hospital Medical Training Institute was founded in the hospital.

In 1899, the "Office of the Taiwan Governor Medical School" was established and then merged with the Institute.

In 1927, the school was renamed as "Taipei Medical Professional School", and in 1936 it was incorporated into the Taipei Imperial University.

=== Postwar Taiwan ===
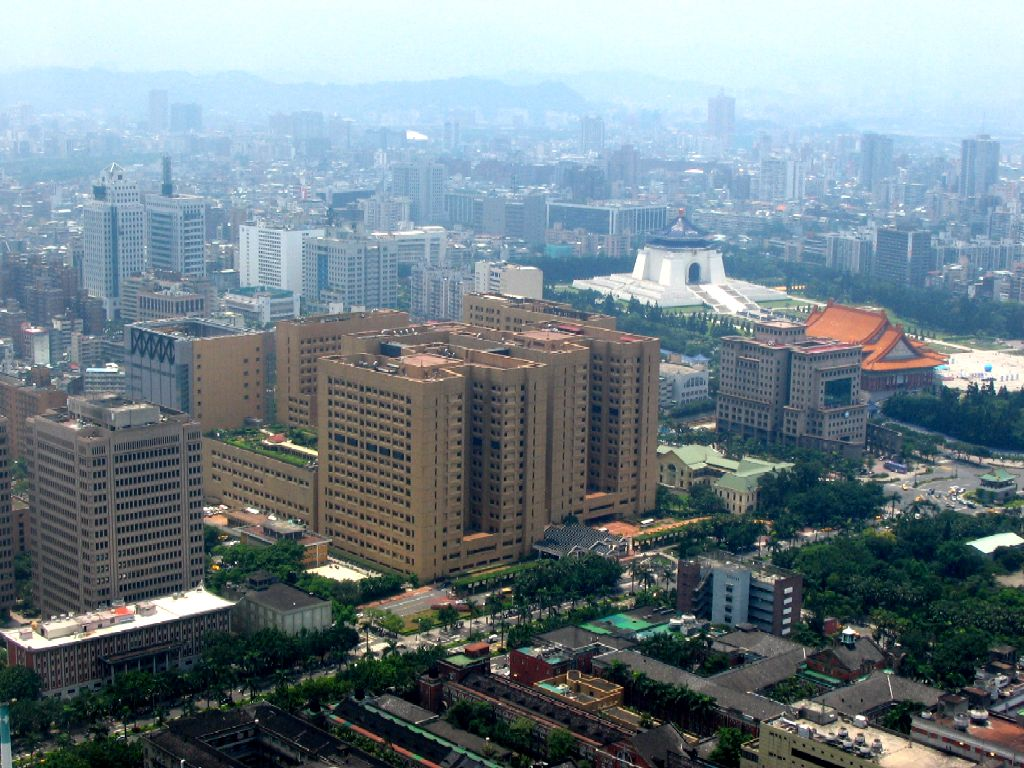
The East Site of National Taiwan University Hospital, completed in 1991, connects to the newly built medical college building.

In 1945, after the Republic of China government took over the Imperial University and reorganized it into National Taiwan University. The Imperial University Faculty of Medicine became the National Taiwan University College of Medicine.

In 1951, The Institute of Public Health was established in the college. In 1953, the School of Pharmacy was established. In 1955, the School of Dentistry was established.

In 1956, the Schools of Nursing and Medical Technology was established.

In 1962, the Deportments of Anesthesiology, Urology and Dermatology were established.

In 1969, the Institute of Anatomy was established.

In 1970, the Institute of Pharmaceutical Sciences and The School of Rehabilitation Medicine was established.

In 1978, the Institute of Clinical Medicine was established (for medical graduates only).

In 1987, the Department of Rehabilitation was established.

In 1993, the Department of Emergency Medicine and the Institute of Immunology was established.

In 1998, the Institute of Biomedical Engineering was established jointly with the College of Engineering.

In December 2000, the Institute of Clinical Pharmacy and Cancer Research Center was established.

In September 2007, Terry Gou donated NT$15 billion to National Taiwan University, of which NT$10 billion was used to build the 500-bed National Taiwan University Hospital Cancer Medical Center (NTUCC) and the Proton Center; the remaining NT$5 billion was used by the Yongling Foundation founded by Terry Gou and NTU to collaborate on four projects: high-end medical equipment, stem cell transplantation, preventive medicine, and medical engineering.

In 2013, the School of Pharmacy was established.

In 2018, the cancer center hospital began trial operation. On July 4, 2019, the Cancer Center Hospital officially opened for service. On December 19, the Cancer Center Hospital held a naming ceremony and renamed the building "Yongzhen Health Medical Building" after Terry Gou's mother, Chu Yongzhen.

In March 2021, the formerly independent Cancer Center Hospital was restructured into a Cancer Center Branch Hospital affiliated with the University Hospital (still called NTUCC in English) due to financial deficits.

== Teaching Programs ==
There is a wide range of undergraduate, graduate, and doctorate programs in various disciplines, including medicine, dentistry, nursing, pharmacy, and public health, with both theoretical knowledge and practical skills. The college also has partnerships with a number of prestigious medical institutions and hospitals in Taiwan and around the world.

== College Deans ==
For the complete Chronological List of Deans, please visit the source.

=== Taiwan under Japanese rule ===
- Hidetaka Yamaguchi: Founder, Taipei Hospital Medical Training Institute; 1st President, Taiwan Sōtokufu Medical School: 1897.4-1902.1
- Tomoe Takagi: 2nd President, Office of the Taiwan Governor Medical School; 1902.3-1915.3
- Tsugio Horiuchi: 3rd President; 1915-1918; President, Taipei Medical Professional School; 1919-1936, 1915.4-1936.3

...

=== National Taiwan University, College of Medicine ===
- Tsung-Ming Tu: 1st Dean, 1945.12 - 1947.3
- Zhi-zhong Yan: 2nd Dean, 1947.3 - 1948.6
- Tsung-Ming Tu: 3rd Dean, 1948.7 - 1953.7

...

- Ding-Shinn Chen: 13th Dean, 2001.8 - 2007.7
- Pan-Chyr Yang: 14th Dean, 2007.8 - 2013.7
- Shan-Chwen Chang: 15th Dean, 2013.8 - 2019.8
- Ni Yanxuan: 16th Dean, 2019.8 ~

== See also ==
- National Taiwan University
- Taiwanese Bunun Ancestral Remains Repatriation Case
- List of medical schools in Taiwan
