= Chang Yu-fa =

Taiwanese historian

- 張玉法
- Born: 1 February 1935 (age 91); Shandong
- Education: National Taiwan Normal University (BA); Columbia University (MA); National Chengchi University (MA)

Chang Yu-fa (Chinese: 張玉法; pinyin: Zhāng Yùfǎ; born 1 February 1935) is a Taiwanese historian.

== Life and career ==
He was born in Shandong on 1 February 1935, and moved to Taiwan in 1949. Chang earned a bachelor's degree from National Taiwan Normal University, and two master's degrees, one in history from Columbia University, and the other in journalism from National Chengchi University. He served as director of Academia Sinica's Institute of Modern History from 1985 to 1991, and was elected as academician of Academia Sinica in 1992. After leaving the directorship, Chang remained at the Institute of Modern History as an adjunct research fellow.

== Selected publications ==
- Chang, Yu-fa (1975). Revolutionary Organizations of the Ch'ing Period. Taipei: Academia Sinica.
- Chang, Yu-fa (1982). Modernization in China, 1860-1916: A Regional Study of Social, Political, and Economic Change in Shantung Province. Taipei: Academia Sinica.
