= Bunun people =

Taiwanese indigenous people

Bunun Vonum
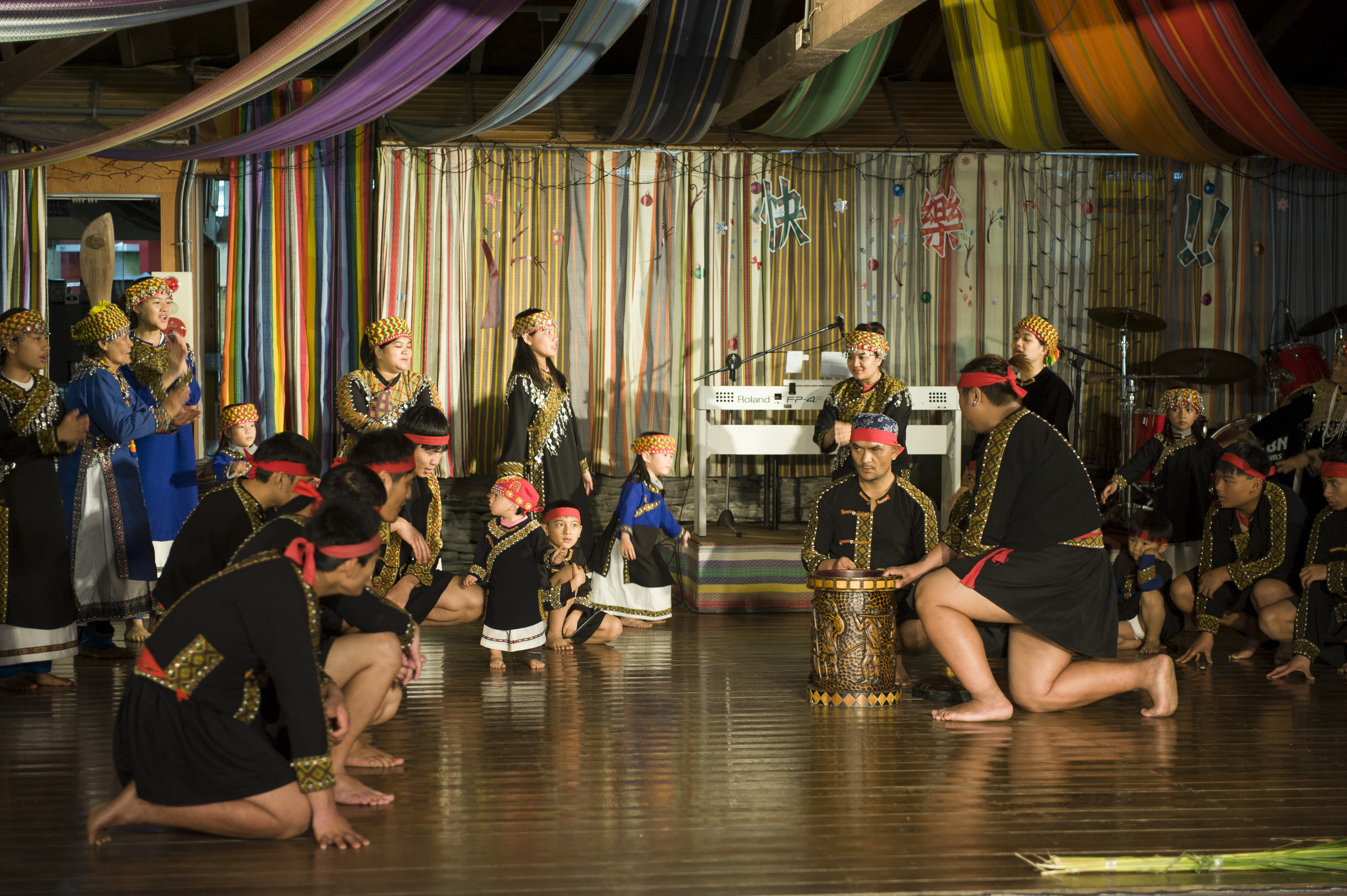

Total population
- 59,655 (2020)

Regions with significant populations
- Taiwan

Languages
- Bunun, Mandarin

Religion
- Animism, Christianity

Related ethnic groups
- Taiwanese indigenous peoples

The Bunun (Bunun: Bunun; Chinese: 布農; pinyin: Bùnóng), also historically known as the Vonum, are a Taiwanese indigenous people. They speak the Bunun language. Unlike other Indigenous peoples in Taiwan, the Bunun are widely dispersed across the island's central mountain ranges. In the year 2000, the Bunun numbered 41,038. This was approximately 8% of Taiwan's total indigenous population, making them the fourth-largest indigenous group. They have five distinct communities: the Takbunuaz, the Takituduh, the Takibaka, the Takivatan, and the Isbukun.

In the Bunun language, the name "Bunun" literally means "human," "human being," "man," or "people."

== History ==
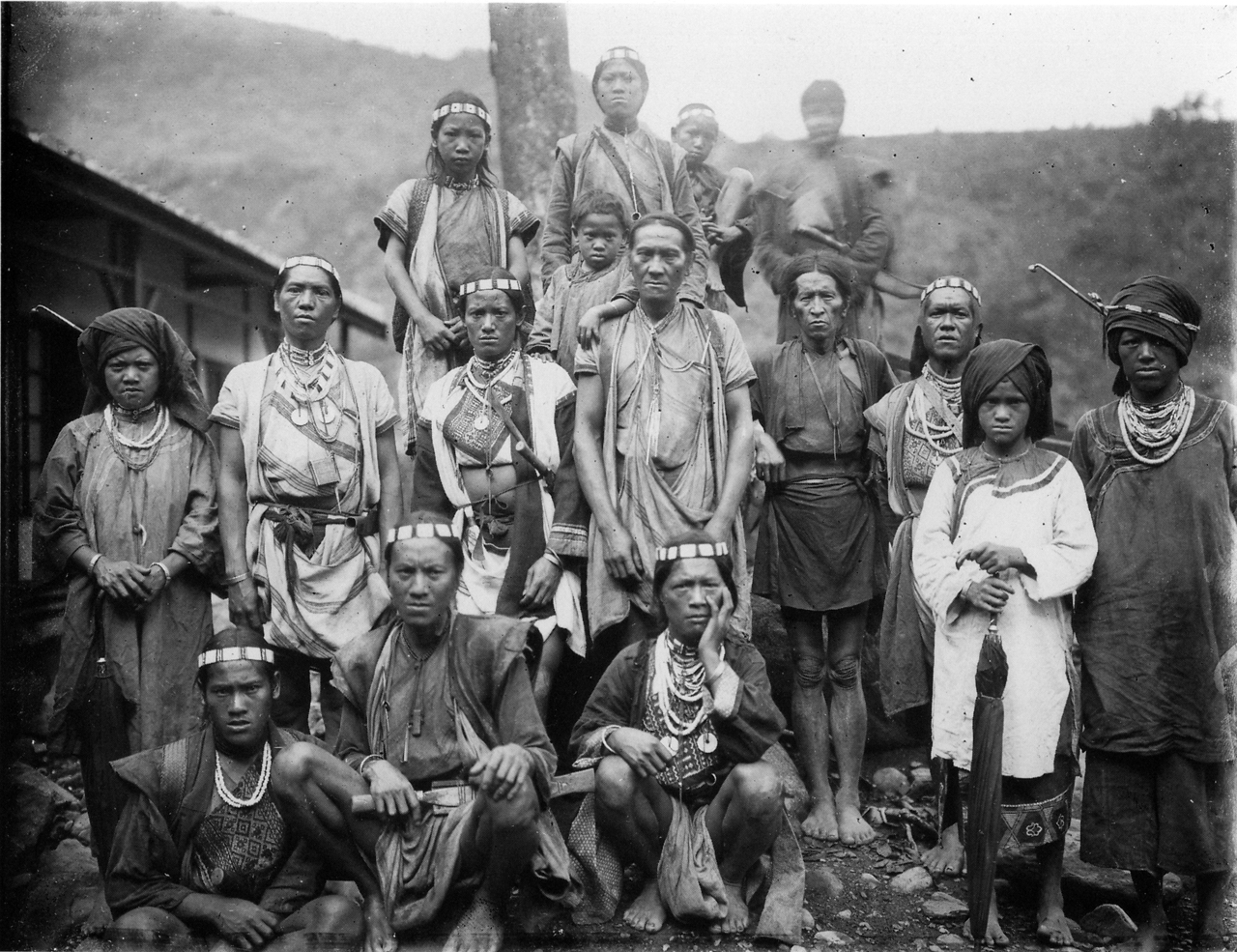
Bunun in 1900. Photograph by Torii Ryūzō.

Until the coming of the Christian missionaries in the beginning of the 20th century, the Bunun were known to be fierce warriors and headhunters. The Bunun were one of the "high-mountain peoples" (along with the Atayal and the Taroko) who traditionally lived in small family units in Taiwan's Central Mountain Range and were hostile to all outsiders, whether they be Chinese immigrants or surrounding Indigenous peoples. Whereas most other Indigenous peoples were quite sedentary and tended to live in lower areas, the Bunun, along with the Atayal and Taroko were constantly on the move in Taiwan's Central Mountain Range, looking for new hunting grounds and practicing slash-and-burn agriculture. Their staple foods were millet, yam, and game.

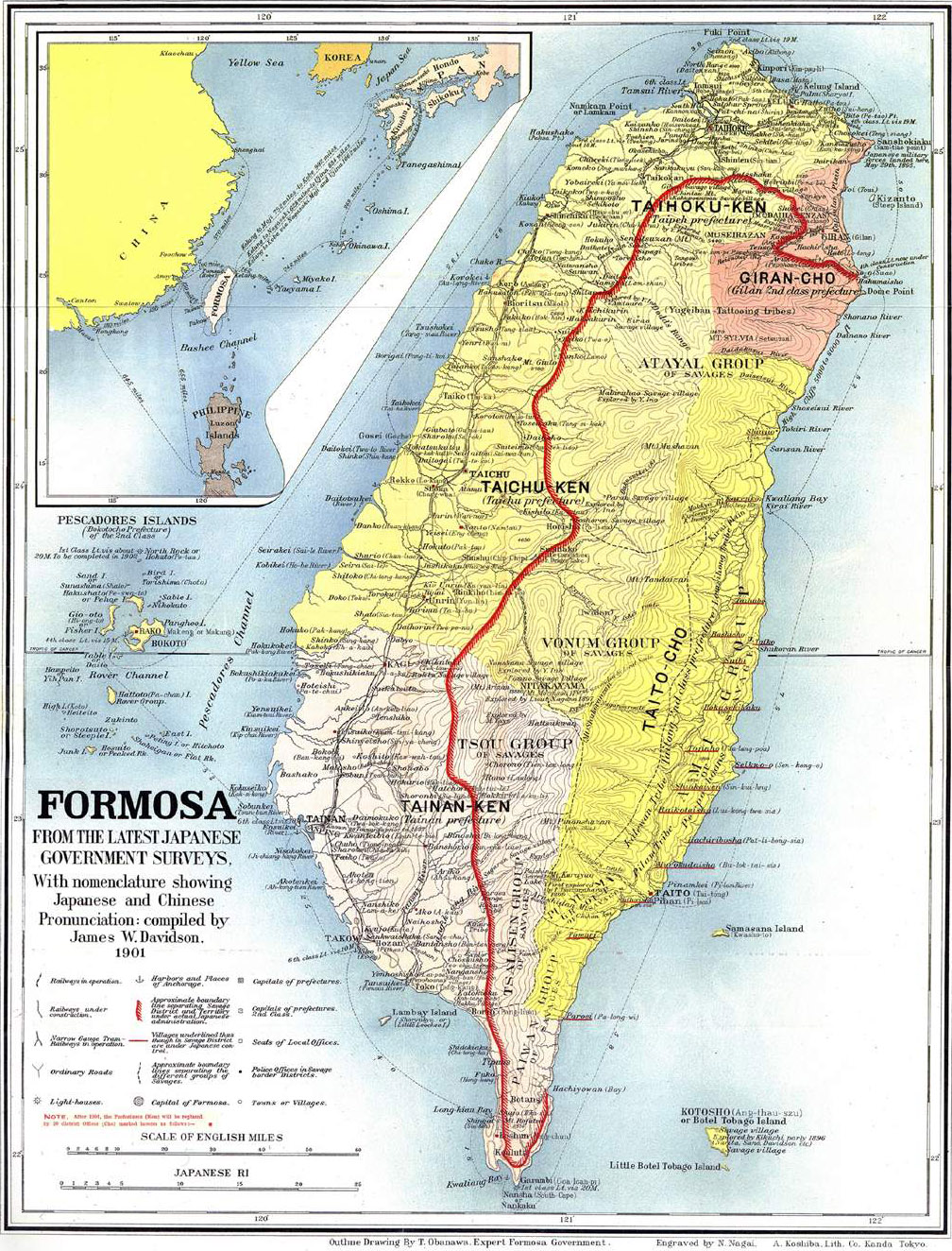
Taiwan in 1901, with the Bunun marked as "Vonum Group".

During the Japanese rule (1895–1945), the Bunun were among the last peoples to be "pacified" by the Japanese government in residence. After an initial period of fierce resistance, they were forced to move down from the mountains and concentrated into a number of lowland villages that were spread across the island. As a result, the family unit became less important and life centred on individual village units. The Japanese government restricted hunting practices (mainly to control the use of firearms) and introduced wet rice cultivation. Under Chief Raho Ari (lāhè· āléi), the Bunun people engaged in guerrilla warfare against Japan for 20 years. Raho Ari's revolt was sparked when the Japanese implemented a gun control policy in 1914 against the Bunun people in which their rifles were impounded in police stations when hunting expeditions were over. The Dafen Incident began at Dafen when a police platoon was slaughtered by Raho Ari's clan in 1915. A settlement holding 266 people called Tamaho was created by Raho Ari and his followers near the source of the Laonong River and attracted more Bunun rebels to their cause. Raho Ari and his followers captured bullets and guns and slew Japanese in repeated hit-and-run raids against Japanese police stations by infiltrating over the Japanese "guardline" of electrified fences and police stations as they pleased. Raho Ari formally ended guerrilla activities against Japan in April 1933. Many Bunun were recruited as local policemen, and, during World War II, the Japanese army had Bunun regiments.

In 1941 the Bunun were relocated following the Pasnanavan incident.

Throughout the 20th century, several waves of missionaries of various denominations spread across Taiwan. They were particularly successful with the Indigenous inhabitants of the island. After the last missionary wave in the 1940s, which originated in Japan, a majority of Indigenous people were converted to Christianity. Today, most Bunun either belong to the Catholic Church or to the local Presbyterian Church.

After the arrival of the Chinese Nationalist Kuomintang in October 1945, difficult days began for the Indigenous population. The "one language, one culture" policy of the Nationalist government prohibited to use of any language other than Standard Mandarin, for official use as well as in daily life, and Indigenous cultures were systematically discriminated against and encouraged to assimilate into mainstream culture. Bunun culture was eroded by the joint pressure of their new faith as well as the government's sinification policies. The situation improved only recently after two decades of democratic reforms.

== Culture ==
=== Clothing ===
Originally, the Bunun people crafted their clothing from animal skins and linen. However, through integration with the Han people, they started to use materials such as cotton and wool.

Men's clothing features an open white vest with vibrant multi-colored geometrical patterns at the opening and on the back. These patterns primarily feature the colors pink, green, yellow, red, and dark blue. Bunun people wear this vest with a short black skirt and a colorful abdominal bag, functioning as a type of undergarment. These clothes are usually worn during rituals. Another version of men's clothing consists of a knee-length black skirt paired with a black or blue long-sleeved coat with colorful embroidery on the neckline, in the middle of the coat and on the back.

Women's clothing includes a long black or blue dress with extended sleeves with embroidery at the sleeve ends and dress placket. Another attire involves a long-sleeved shirt with embroidery at the sleeve ends, collar, shirt placket, and bottom hem. This shirt is paired with a long skirt with a colorful pattern at the bottom hem, and an apron worn over the skirt. The apron has embroidery at the center, left side, and bottom. Another version includes trousers worn under the apron.

Additionally, the Bunun people adorn themselves with various ornaments and accessories, such as headbands exclusively worn by men, hats, and necklaces. Most of these accessories are crafted from glass beads or shell pieces.

=== Music ===
The Pasibutbut is a song of Bunun Sowing Festival, sung polyphonically in four-part harmony (Common 8 heterophonic voice, usually 5-12 heterophonic voices). The Taiwan composer Jin Fong Yang (楊金峯) analysed the structure of this song. The Japanese musicologist Takatomo Kurosawa (黑澤隆朝) recorded Bunun musicians in 1943.

The latuk (Chinese: 弓琴; pinyin: Gōngqín) is a traditional instrument constructed similarly to a hunting bow, hence it is also referred to as the Bunun bow-harp. The body of the bow is constructed out of either Makino (Phyllostachys Makinoi) or Fargesia bamboo. While the string was traditionally composed of Peach Wood, Hemp, and Rattan, today steel strings are used. The instrument is played by placing one's mouth on the end of the bow, plucking the string, and manipulating overtones with mouth shaping and breath to produce melody, similarly to the Jew's Harp. The name derives from ‘la’ meaning to pluck, and tuk, an onomatopoeia for the sound the instrument makes. The Bunun people traditionally play the latuk during leisure time alone, especially after dusk to midnight. The instrument functions as a means of self-entertainment and emotional expression, such as the relief of loneliness or grief, rather than being played in public or ceremonial settings This reflects the broader Bunun musical tradition, which is strongly centred around vocals, with instruments serving more personal and supplementary roles. The latuk first appears in archival records in 1776 in the Qing Imperial Illustrations of Tributary Peoples (番社采風圖考). Commissioned by the Qing court, it records the various historical use-cases including courtship, comforting and, unlike today, use in celebrations. As late as 1943, the Bunun latuk is recorded by Takatomo Kurosawa (黑澤隆朝) as being used by Bunun men in courtship; “They would hide beneath the eaves of their beloved’s house and play self-composed love songs”.

The Bunun wooden pestle ensemble, commonly referred to as tultul, is a traditional percussion performance that originated from communal millet farming. It is performed by striking wooden pestles of different lengths and thicknesses against a hard surface, traditionally a stone slab. Ensembles typically consist of four to sixteen players arranged in a circle, with each pestle producing different pitches and rhythms. Through coordinated playing and rhythmic improvisation, the performers create polyrhythmic patterns . The pestle initially served to call relatives and neighbors to participate in millet pounding as a form of labor exchange, before gradually developing into work music and communal leisure. In the late 20th century, it evolved into cultural performances and became associated with tribal tourism, particularly in Mingde and Dili village. However, the tradition has faced challenges in intergenerational transmission. Tseng reported that a pestle ensemble documented in Luona in 2010 could no longer be formed in 2014 due to a decline in elderly performers. Efforts to preserve the tradition include cultural education, community participation, and the transmission of musical knowledge to younger generations.

=== Legends ===
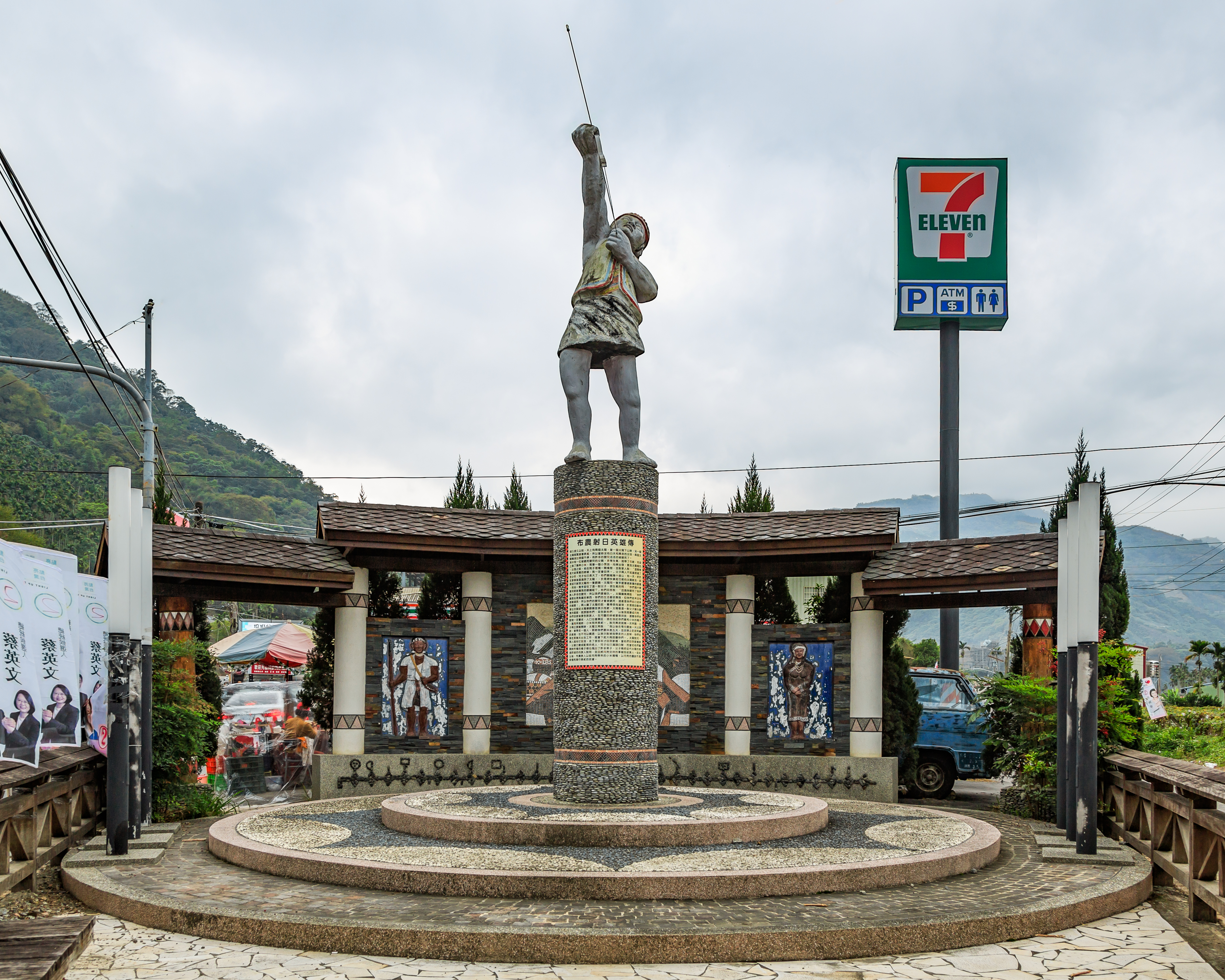
Bunun Monument in Xinyi Township

According to Bunun legend, in times long past, two suns shone down upon the Earth and made it unbearably hot. A father and a son endured numerous hardships and finally shot down one of the suns, which then became the moon. In its wrath, the moon demanded that father and son would return to their own people to tell them that they henceforth had to obey three commandments or face annihilation. The first was that they had to constantly observe the waxing and waning of the moon and conduct all rituals and work according to its rhythm. The second commandment stated that all Bunun had to conduct rituals throughout their lives to honor the spirits of heaven and Earth. The third commandment told them of forbidden behaviours, and forced them to become an orderly and peaceful people.

A variant of the story tells that long, long ago, a mother and father went out working in the field and took their newly born son with them. While working, they put the child in a basket at the side of the field, and for a whole day he lay in the unbearable heat of the two suns. When the parents returned in the late afternoon, they found that their son had completely dried up and turned into a black lizard. Stricken by grief, the father took his bow and shot down one of the suns.

This story illustrates the importance of the sky in traditional Bunun animist religion. The Bunun assumed that the world in which they lived were full of supernatural beings (qanitu) that were often associated with particular places (trees, rocks, etc.). An important locus of supernatural power was the sky (dihanin/diqanin). All supernatural forces seem to have had a fairly abstract character and it is therefore not really clear whether the sky was a god or just a place in which all kinds of spirits lived.

The origin story of the Bunun people's tendency to live in mountainous areas was relayed by the wife of the American consul general in Yokohama in the following way:

According to a tribal legend, the Vonum Group of Formosan mountain savages lived in the plains until the misfortune of an all-destroying deluge befell them. With the flood came a huge serpent, which swam through the stormy waters toward the terrorized people. They owed their deliverance from the great snake to the timely appearance of a monster crab, which, after a terrific battle, succeeded in killing the reptile. - Alice Ballantine Kirjassoff, March 1920

=== Lunar calendar ===
It is certain, however, that the moon was considered to be one of the major spirits, and almost all activities in daily life had to be aligned with the lunar calendar. This could go very far, for instance, in a certain lunar month it was forbidden for women to wash themselves. The Bunun are the only Indigenous people in Taiwan that developed a primitive form of writing to record lunar cycles and their relationship to important events such as the harvest or the slaughter of pigs.

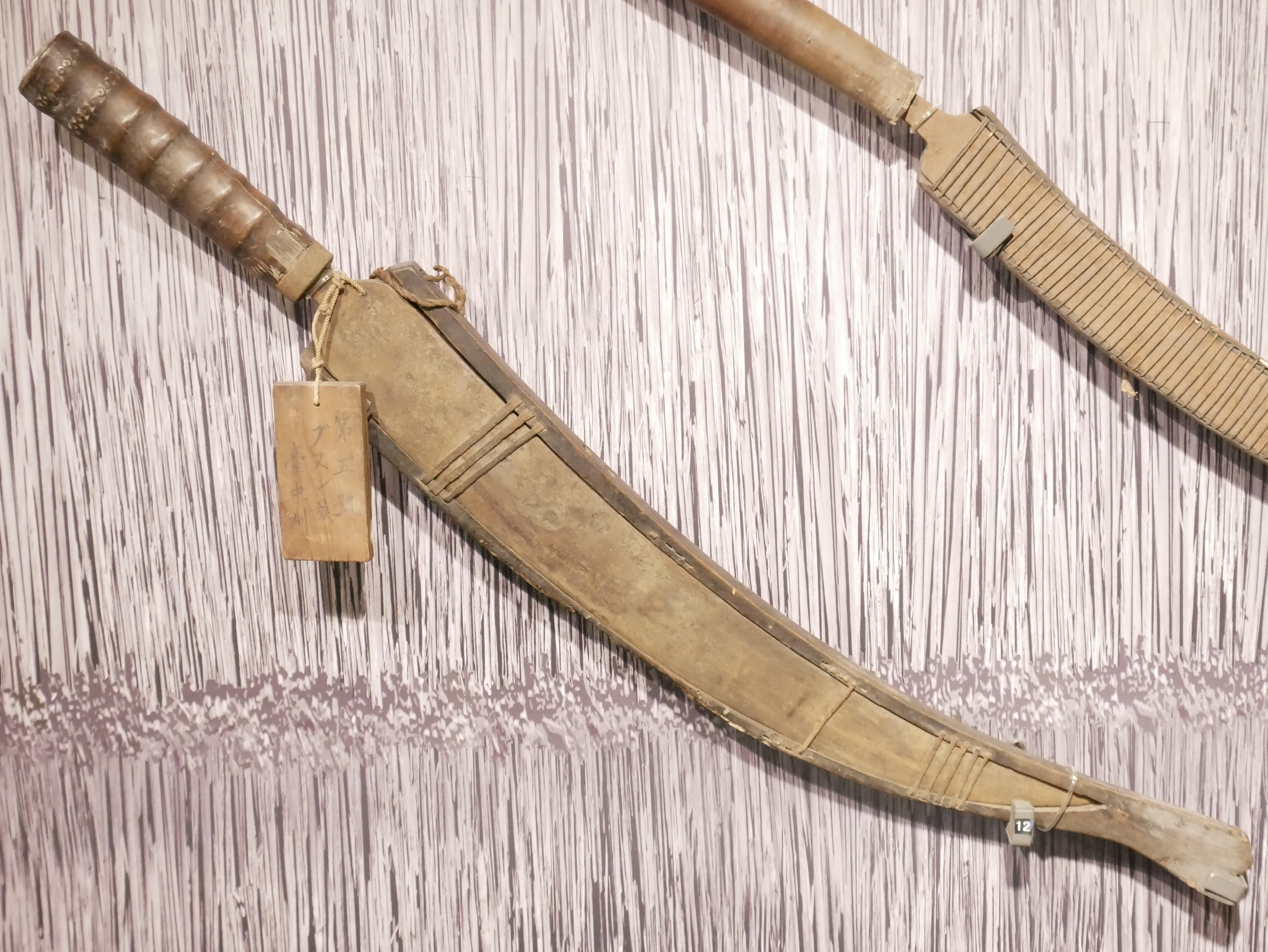
Bunun knives.

The prescriptions related to the lunar calendar are part of a larger system of prescriptions and taboos that used to govern all aspects of Bunun life. Many of these had a ritualistic character and all were part of an age-based pecking order where an absolute obedience to one's elders was demanded. For instance, in order to determine whether a man could go hunting, he had to wait until one of the elders had had a prophetic dream (matibahi). If the dream was good, he could go out hunting. A bad dream indicated that great mishap would befall the hunter if he would go in the woods, and the elders would forbid him to go. Most of these rules fell into disuse after the coming of Christianity (which branded them as superstition), but present-day Bunun society has retained a number of social rituals and still imposes a strong obligation on children to behave in a respectful and obedient way towards anyone that is older than themselves.

=== Agriculture ===
Taiwan oil millet was one of the staple crops of the Bunun people until their 1941 relocation. In the 21st century, Taiwanese oil millet cultivation has been revived.

=== Ear-shooting festival ===
Malahtangia, the ear-shooting festival is a male rite of passage ceremony in Bunun culture. The festival is usually held between March and April, and women are traditionally barred from attending. Before the festival, every adult male would journey to the mountains to hunt. Following a successful hunt, the men would return home and hang the carcasses from wooden frames so that the boys could shoot the dead animals. Those who could shoot a deer's ear were considered especially talented due to its small size. After this ritual, the participating boys were considered adults and could from then on join their brothers and fathers in the hunt.

With modern lifestyle changes in Bunun society, the ear-shooting festival has become more of a ritualized performance; though the marksmanship and hunting skills taught through the festival are no longer as relevant, the event is still considered beneficial as it teaches respect for elders and the community at large.

== Notable Bunun people ==
- Bukun Ismahasan Islituan, poet and writer
- Chiang Chih-chung, javelin thrower
- Savungaz Valincinan (Li Pin-han), politician and television personality
- Lin Tzu-wei, baseball player
- Sammi Kao, pop singer
- Sharon Kao, actress
- Wen Chih-hao, footballer

== Y-chromosome DNA haplogroup ==
According to a study published in 2014, the Y-DNA of the Bunun people belongs mainly to haplogroup O1a2-M50 (34/56 = 60.7%) or haplogroup O2a1a-M88 (21/56 = 37.5%), with a single representative of haplogroup P*-M45(xQ-M242, R-M207) (1/56 = 1.8%). Haplogroup O-M88 is rare among other Indigenous peoples of Taiwan and its vicinity, being found more commonly among populations of southwestern China and the northern parts of Mainland Southeast Asia, such as Tai peoples and Vietnamese.

== Tourist attractions ==
- Bunun Cultural Museum
- Bunun Leisure Farm

== See also ==
- Demographics of Taiwan
- Taiwanese indigenous peoples
- Taiwanese Bunun Ancestral Remains Repatriation Case
