= 1653 imperial election =

Imperial election in the Holy Roman Empire

- 31 May 1653

7 Prince-electors (Note: Following the Peace of Westphalia, the electoral college was expanded to eight members. Ferdinand IV, holding the Bohemian electoral vote, abstained from the ballot.) 5 votes needed to win
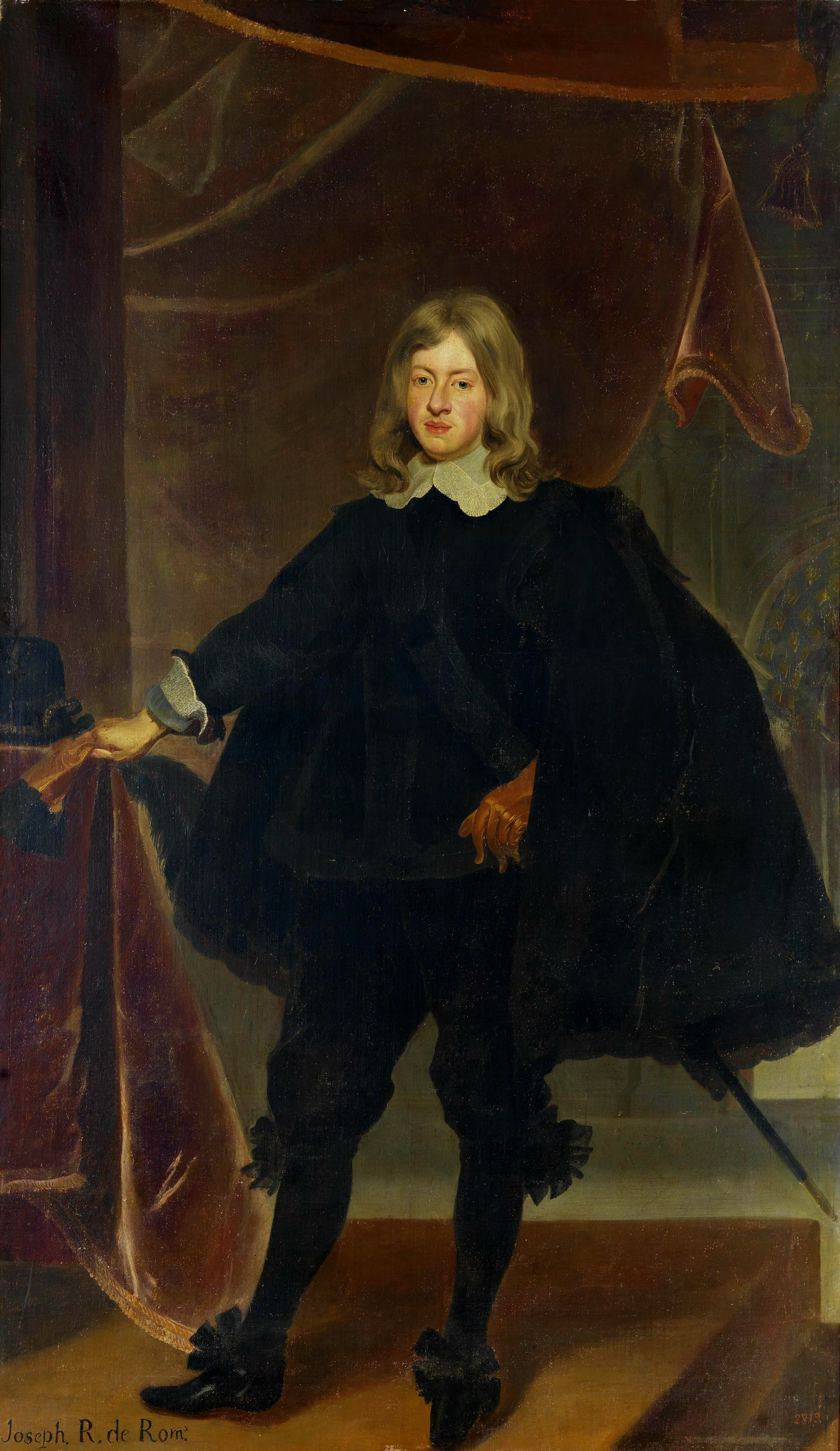
Candidate	Ferdinand IV
House	Habsburg
Electoral vote	7
Percentage	100%
Emperor before election
Ferdinand III
House of Habsburg
Elected Emperor (Note: Ferdinand was elected as King of the Romans to act as Ferdinand III's designated successor and co-ruler. However, he predeceased his father in 1654 and never assumed the title of Emperor.)
Ferdinand IV
House of Habsburg

The imperial election of 1653 was an imperial election held to select the emperor of the Holy Roman Empire. It took place in Augsburg on May 31.

== Background ==
This was the first imperial election to take place after the Thirty Years' War.

On October 31, 1517, Martin Luther, a professor of moral theology at the University of Wittenberg, now part of the Martin Luther University of Halle-Wittenberg, had delivered the Ninety-five Theses to Albert of Brandenburg, the elector of Mainz. This list of propositions criticized the practice of selling indulgences, remissions of the punishment meted out for sin in Purgatory. Luther's criticism snowballed into a massive schism in the church, and from there into a split among the states of the empire.

On August 26 and 27, 1619, the Protestant estates of Kingdom of Bohemia deposed the Catholic king Ferdinand II, Holy Roman Emperor and invited the Lutheran elector Palatine, Frederick V, to take his place. This Bohemian Revolt was put down with the help of the Catholic League, a confederation of Catholic princes of the empire. The league's leader, Maximilian I, Elector of Bavaria, was granted the Upper Palatinate and its electoral rights in a treaty of 1619, confirmed at the Diet of Regensburg on February 25, 1623.

The revolt ignited a broader religious war across Germany, the Thirty Years' War, which would involve not only the states of the empire but also Sweden, the Dutch Republic, France, Denmark–Norway, England, Scotland, Spain and Hungary and which would kill some eight million people before its end. The Peace of Westphalia which ended the war in 1648 revived the principle of cuius regio, eius religio established in 1555 by the Peace of Augsburg and established the modern concept of Westphalian sovereignty. It additionally reinstated the electoral rights of the Electoral Palatinate, though not its territorial rights in the Upper Palatinate. Bavaria was raised to the Electorate of Bavaria, bringing the number of electors of the empire to eight.

Ferdinand III, Holy Roman Emperor called for the election of his successor. To avoid a tie, his son, Ferdinand IV, king of Bohemia and the presumptive favorite, agreed to abstain. The remaining seven electors were:

- Johann Philipp von Schönborn, elector of Mainz
- Karl Kaspar von der Leyen, elector of Trier
- Maximilian Henry of Bavaria, elector of Cologne
- Ferdinand Maria, elector of Bavaria
- John George I, elector of Saxony
- Frederick William, elector of Brandenburg
- Charles I Louis, elector of the Electoral Palatinate

== Election results ==
Ferdinand IV was elected king of the Romans.

Elector	Electorate	Vote
Maximilian Henry of Bavaria	Cologne	Ferdinand IV
Philipp Christoph von Sötern	Trier	Ferdinand IV
Charles I Louis	Palatinate	Ferdinand IV
Maximilian I	Bavaria	Ferdinand IV
John George I	Saxony	Ferdinand IV
Frederick William	Brandenburg	Ferdinand IV
Lothar Franz von Schönborn	Mainz	Ferdinand IV
Total		7 votes, 100% (unanimous)

== Aftermath ==
Ferdinand IV predeceased his father, dying of smallpox on July 9, 1654.
