= 1690 imperial election =

- 24 January 1690

7 Prince-electors (Note: One elector, Leopold I, holding the Bohemian electoral vote, abstained from the ballot.) 5 votes needed to win (Note: Five votes were required to establish an absolute majority of the eight electoral seats.)
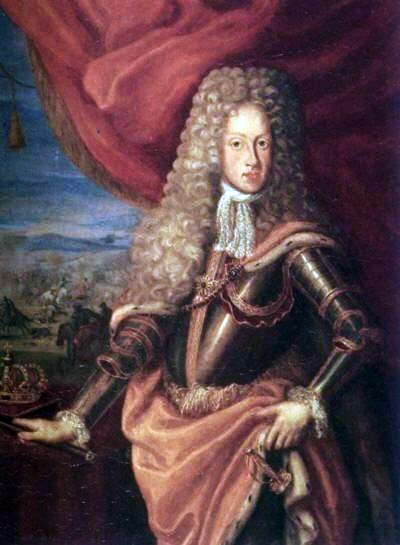
Candidate	Joseph I
House	Habsburg
Electoral vote	7
Percentage	100%
Emperor before election
Leopold I
House of Habsburg
Elected Emperor (Note: Joseph was elected as King of the Romans to act as Leopold I's designated successor and co-ruler. He became Emperor upon his father's death in 1705.)
Joseph I
House of Habsburg

The imperial election of 1690 was an imperial election held on 24 January 1690 in Augsburg to select a King of the Romans and designated successor to Emperor Leopold I of the Holy Roman Empire. The election took place against the backdrop of the Great Turkish War and the outbreak of the Nine Years' War, during which Louis XIV of France had invaded the empire in 1688. All seven participating electors voted unanimously for Joseph, Leopold's eldest son, who was duly elected King of the Romans. Joseph did not reign as emperor in his own right until his father's death on 5 May 1705.

== Background ==
On 26 May 1685, Charles II, Elector Palatine, the Calvinist elector of the Electoral Palatinate, died without children. He was succeeded by his Catholic cousin Philip William, Elector Palatine, bringing the balance of electors to six Catholics, one Calvinist, and one Lutheran.

The Holy Roman Empire had been embroiled since 1683 in the Great Turkish War, repelling attempted Ottoman conquests in Southeast Europe. On 25 September 1688, hoping to capitalize on the empire's preoccupation with the Turks, the French King Louis XIV invaded across the Rhine, precipitating the Nine Years' War. Louis's war aims were to install his preferred candidate, Wilhelm Egon von Fürstenberg, bishop of Strasbourg, as elector of Cologne, and to occupy the Electoral Palatinate, to which he believed he was entitled as Charles II's sister Elizabeth Charlotte, Madame Palatine was the wife of his younger brother Philippe I, Duke of Orléans.

Leopold I, Holy Roman Emperor called for the election of his successor. He was granted one vote as king of Bohemia, but because the even number of electors might result in a tie, following the precedent of the elections of 1653 and 1658, he abstained. The remaining seven electors were:

- Anselm Franz von Ingelheim, elector of Mainz
- Johann Hugo von Orsbeck, elector of Trier
- Joseph Clemens of Bavaria, elector of Cologne
- Maximilian II Emanuel, elector of Bavaria
- John George III, elector of Saxony
- Frederick I of Prussia, elector of Brandenburg
- Philip William, Elector Palatine, elector of the Electoral Palatinate

== Election results ==
Joseph, Leopold's eldest son, was elected king of the Romans.

Elector	Electorate	Vote
Anselm Franz von Ingelheim	Mainz	Joseph I
Johann Hugo von Orsbeck	Trier	Joseph I
Joseph Clemens of Bavaria	Cologne	Joseph I
Frederick I of Prussia	Brandenburg	Joseph I
Maximilian II Emanuel	Bavaria	Joseph I
Philip William	Palatinate	Joseph I
John George III	Saxony	Joseph I
Total		7 votes, 100% (unanimous)

== Aftermath ==
Joseph acceded to the throne on his father's death on 5 May 1705.
