= Johann VIII =

Johann VIII may refer to:

- Johann Hugo von Orsbeck (1634–1711)
- John VIII, Count of Nassau-Siegen (1583–1638)
