= Schloss Philippsburg =

Schloss Philippsburg is the name of:

- Schloss Philippsburg (Braubach) in Braubach, Rhineland-Palatinate, Germany
- Schloss Philippsburg (Koblenz), former schloss in Koblenz-Ehrenbreitstein, Rhineland-Palatinate, Germany
- Schloss Philippsburg (Niederwürzbach), former schloss in Blieskastel-Niederwürzbach, Saarland, Germany
- Schloss Philippsburg (Philippsbourg), former schloss in Philippsbourg, Moselle, France
