= Johann Heinrich von Anethan =

17th-century Roman Catholic bishop

Most Reverend Johann Heinrich von Anethan
- Titular Bishop of Hierapolis in Isauria; Auxiliary Bishop of Cologne
- Church: Catholic Church

Orders
- Consecration: 21 September 1665 by Max Heinrich von Bayern

Personal details
- Born: 1618 Trier, Germany
- Died: 18 June 1693 (aged 74–75)

Johann Heinrich von Anethan (1618–1693) was a Roman Catholic prelate who served as Auxiliary Bishop of Cologne (1680–1693), Auxiliary Bishop of Trier (1676–1680), and Auxiliary Bishop of Hildesheim (1665–1676).

== Biography ==
Johann Heinrich von Anethan was born in Trier, Germany in 1618. On 6 July 1665, he was appointed during the papacy of Pope Alexander VII as Titular Bishop of Hierapolis in Isauria and Auxiliary Bishop of Hildesheim. On 21 September 1665, he was consecrated bishop by Max Heinrich von Bayern, Archbishop of Cologne. On 13 November 1676, he was appointed during the papacy of Pope Innocent XI as Auxiliary Bishop of Trier. On 6 February 1680, he was appointed during the papacy of Pope Innocent XI as Auxiliary Bishop of Cologne. He served as Auxiliary Bishop of Cologne until his death on 18 June 1693.

== Episcopal succession ==
While bishop, he was the principal consecrator of:

- Johann Hugo von Orsbeck, Titular Archbishop of Larissa in Thessalia and Coadjutor Archbishop of Trier (1677);
- Anselm Franz von Ingelheim, Archbishop of Mainz (1680);
- Johann Philipp Burkhard, Titular Bishop of Tripolis in Phoenicia and Auxiliary Bishop of Speyer (1685);

and the principal co-consecrator of:

- Damian Hartard von Leyen-Hohengeroldseck, Archbishop of Mainz (1676);
- Adolph Gottfried Volusius, Titular Bishop of Diocletiana and Auxiliary Bishop of Mainz (1676); and
- Wilhelm Egon von Fürstenberg, Bishop of Strasbourg (1683).

== External links and additional sources ==
- Cheney, David M. "Hierapolis in Isauria (Titular See)". Catholic-Hierarchy.org. (for Chronology of Bishops) ^{[self-published]}
- Chow, Gabriel. "Titular Episcopal See of Hieropolis (Turkey)". GCatholic.org. (for Chronology of Bishops) ^{[self-published]}

Catholic Church titles
Preceded by Giuseppe Maria Sebastiani	Titular Bishop of Hierapolis in Isauria; 1665–1693	Succeeded by Custodio do Pinho
Preceded by	Auxiliary Bishop of Hildesheim; 1665–1676	Succeeded by
Preceded by	Auxiliary Bishop of Trier; 1676–1680	Succeeded by
Preceded by	Auxiliary Bishop of Cologne; 1680–1693	Succeeded by
