= Schloss Philippsburg (Koblenz) =

Former palace of the Electors of Trier near Koblenz in Germany

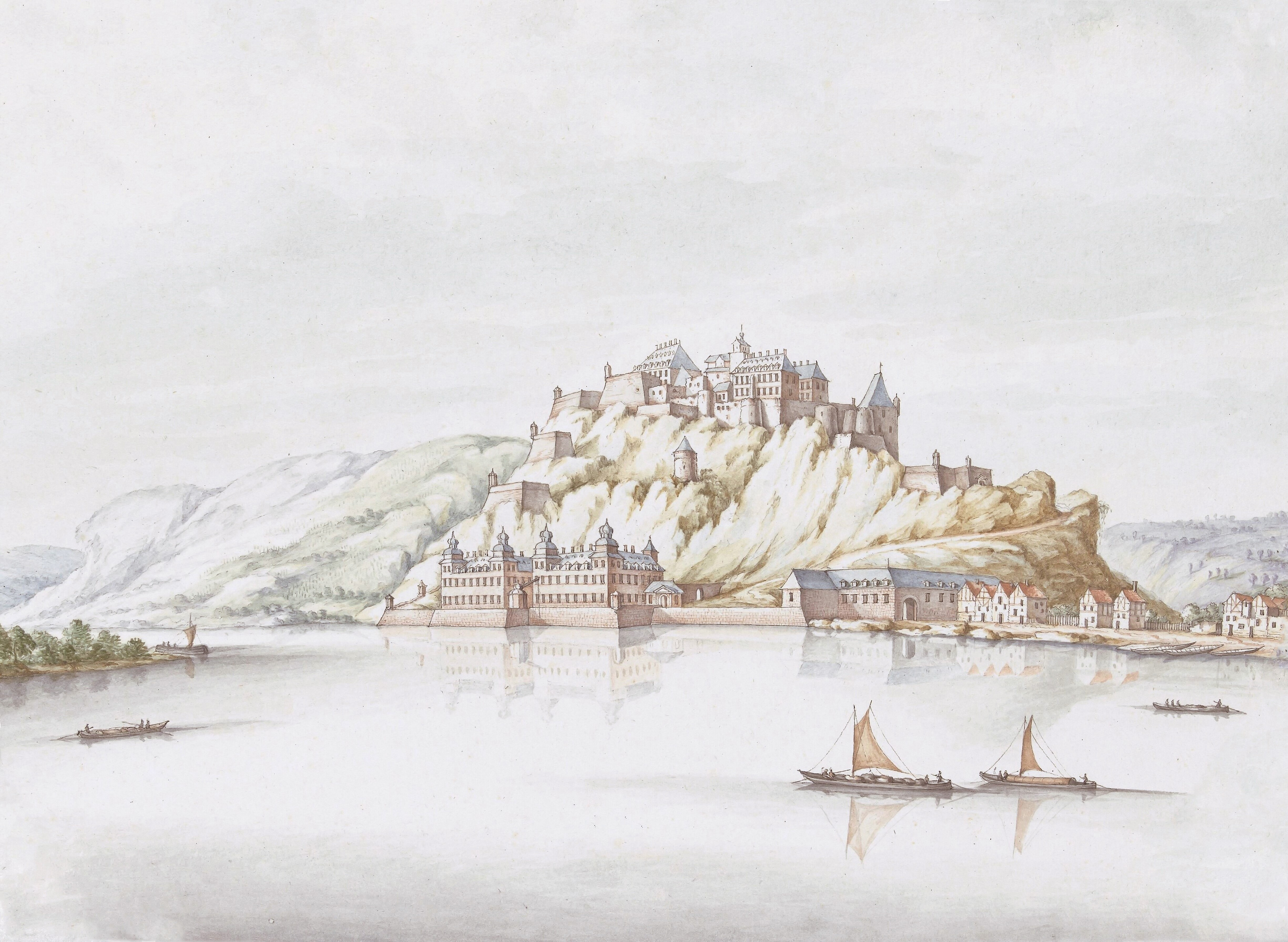
The Electoral Ehrenbreitstein fortress looking down on the Philippsburg on its feet, directly at the Rhine river (around 1700) - by Jan van Call (Rijksmuseum)

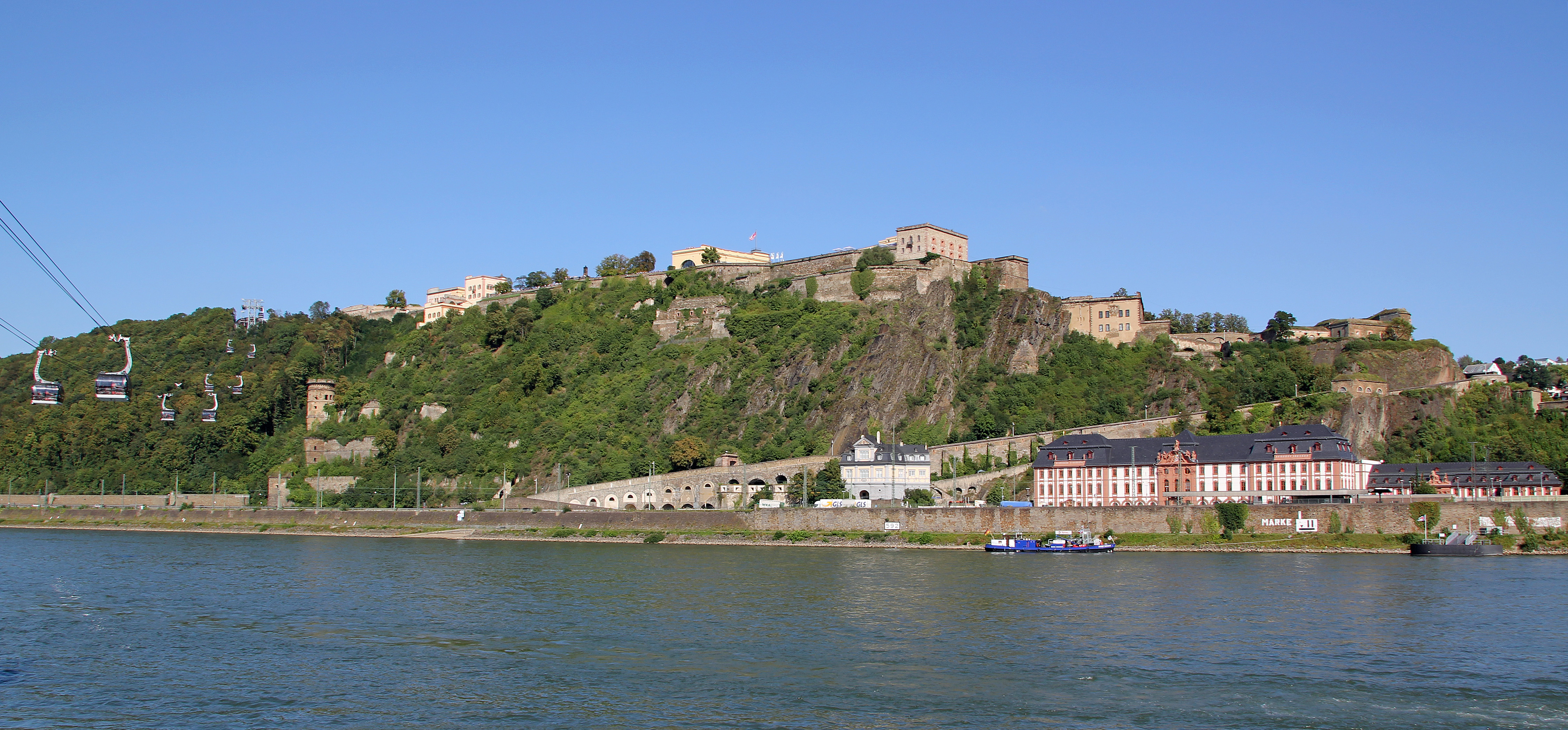
The palace location today. Prussia reconstructed the Ehrenbreitstein fortress in the 19th century. The Philippsburg is disappeared, but its outbuildings are still there such as the Pagerie and the Dicasterial building (around 2011)

The Philippsburg palace (German: Schloss Philippsburg)) was a former Baroque-style palace in Ehrenbreitstein, a district of the city of Koblenz in Germany. It was situated on the banks of the Rhine river, below the Ehrenbreitstein Fortress. Constructed between 1626 and 1632 by Philipp Christoph von Sötern (1567–1652), Prince-Elector of Trier, it served as the main residence of the Archbishops and Prince-Electors of Trier until 1786. The palace had similarities to Schloss Johannisburg in Aschaffenburg, as they have the same architect.

In 1786, Prince-Elector Clemens Wenceslaus of Saxony (1739–1812) erected a new electoral palace in Koblenz on the opposite bank of the Rhine, which then became the primary residence.

During the Napoleonic era, the French army blew up the Ehrenbreitstein fortress in 1801, causing the Philippsburg palace to suffer significant damage and necessitating its demolition. Today, nothing remains of the palace, once one of the largest and most significant Baroque buildings on the Rhine. Only the adjacent structures (the Pagerie, Dicasterial building, Krummstall, and Marstall) have withstood the test of time.

== History ==
=== Philipp Christoph von Sötern ===
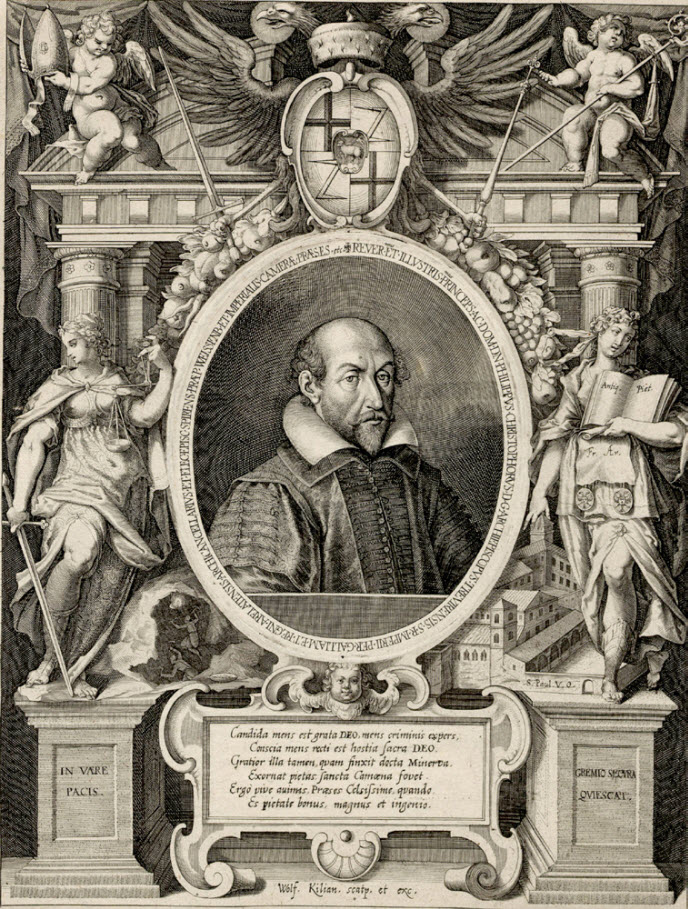
Philipp Christoph von Sötern

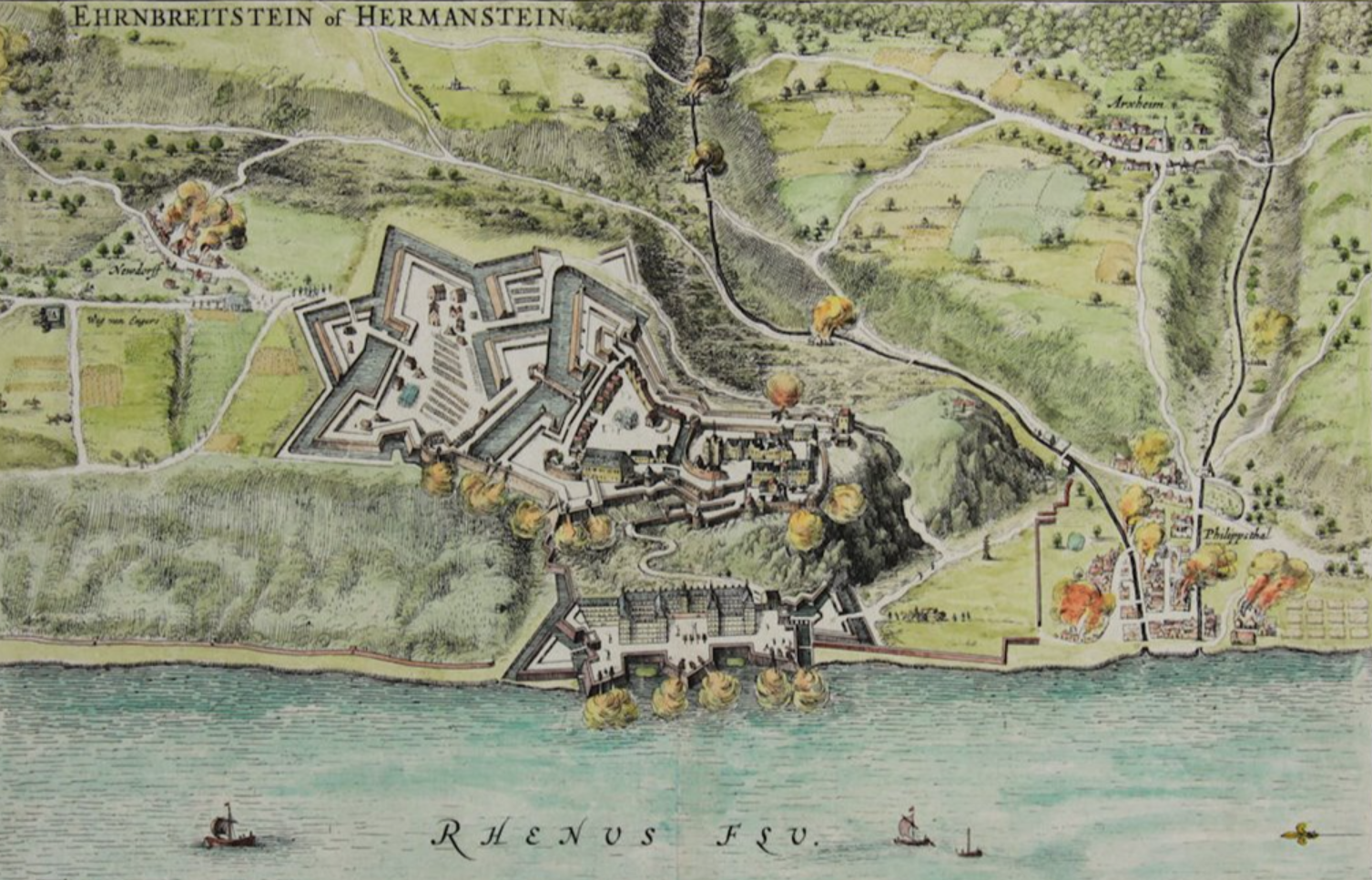
Plan of the Ehrenbreitstein fortress and Philippsburg by Merian (1639)

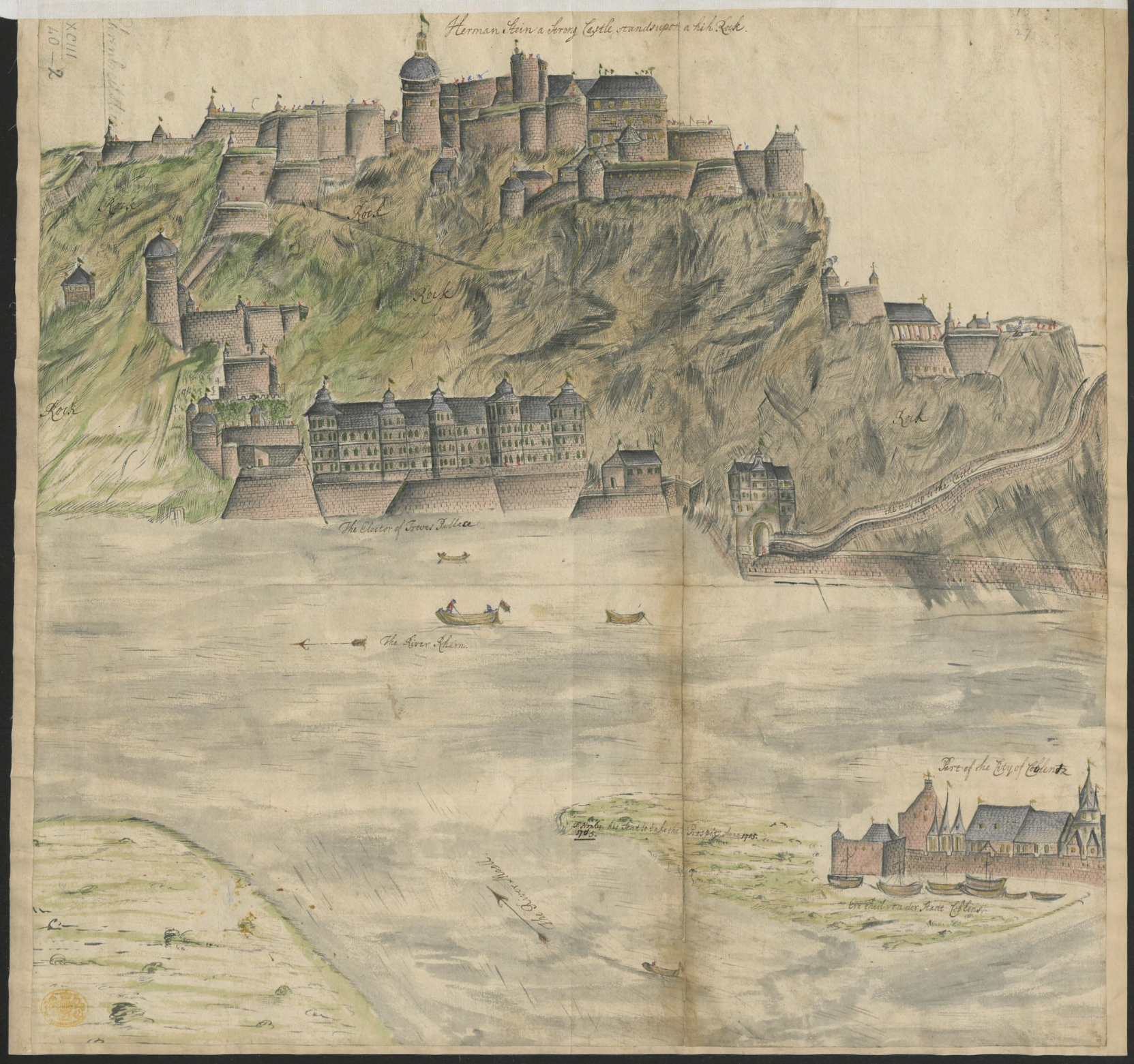
Plan of the Ehrenbreitstein fortress and Philippsburg by Merian (1639)

During the Thirty Years' War, Prince-Elector Philipp Christoph von Sötern (1567–1652) found it necessary to relocate his residence away from Trier, which faced constant threats from France. Opting for a more secure location, he chose to erect a new palace in Koblenz. Positioned below the Ehrenbreitstein fortress, the most formidable stronghold of the Electorate of Trier, directly on the banks of the Rhine River, Philippsburg was built between 1626 and 1632. The architect was Georg Ridinger, who also designed Schloss Johannisburg in Aschaffenburg, for the Prince-Electors of Mainz, between 1605 and 1614. The works were executed by master builder Albrecht Beyer from Bamberg. They created a bastioned residential palace.

Initially aligned with the Catholic League, Sötern's deteriorating relations with the Habsburgs prompted him to switch sides to France, opposing Emperor Ferdinand II. In 1630, upon the request of its inhabitants, imperial troops occupied Trier. With support from French forces, Sötern regained control of the city in 1632. In return and to shield his bishoprics from Swedish troops, Sötern permitted France to occupy the Ehrenbreitstein fortress. However, imperial forces under Christopher of East Frisia unexpectedly recaptured Trier in 1635, leading to Sötern's subsequent imprisonment in Linz from 1635 to 1645.

=== 17th and 18th century: main residence of the Electors of Trier ===
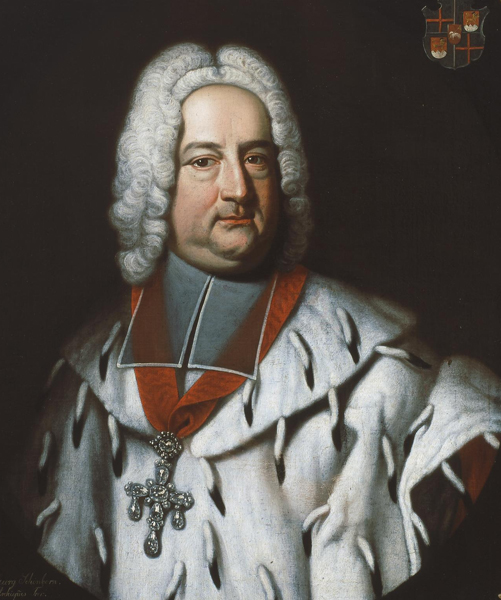
Franz Georg von Schönborn

Vessels on the Rhine in front of the Philippsburg by Jacobus Storck (around 1680–1699)

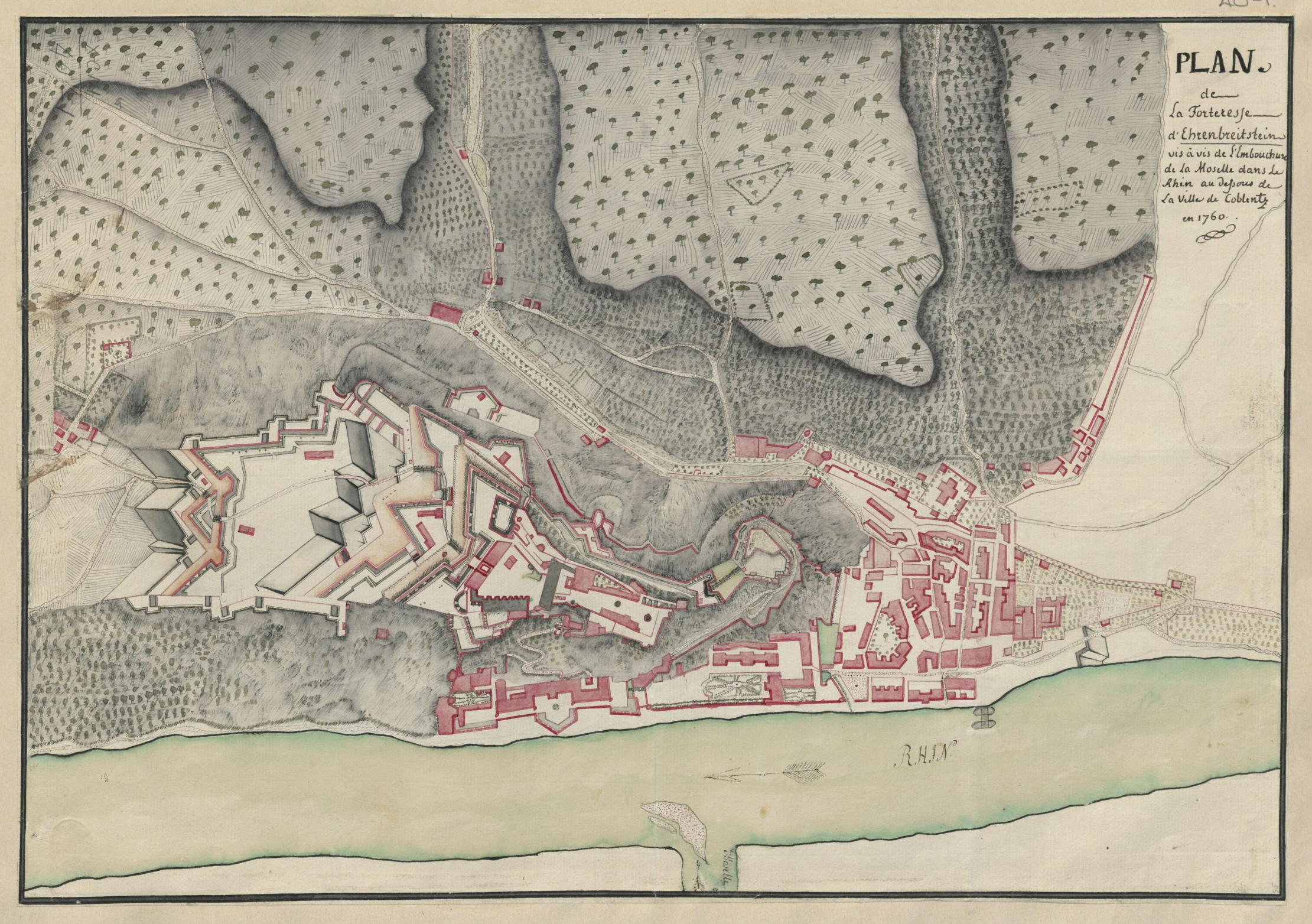
A plan from the Ehrenbreitstein Fortress and the Philippsburg from the British Library (around 1760

Successive Prince-Electors continued to maintain Philippsburg as their primary residence, solidifying its position as the epicenter of the Electorate's political and cultural life.

Furthermore, the palace underwent additional expansion. Prince-Elector Karl Kaspar von der Leyen (1618–1676) oversaw the construction of a pathway behind the palace, leading up to the Ehrenbreitstein Fortress and carved into the rock. Along this pathway, to the south of the palace, court architect Johann Christoph Sebastiani (1640–1701), commissioned by Prince-Elector Johann Hugo von Orsbeck (1634–1711), erected a fortress gatehouse between 1690 and 1692. This gatehouse, known as the Pagerie, served as the New Chancellery.

At the entrance of Philippsburg, Prince-Elector Franz Georg von Schönborn (1682–1756) oversaw the construction of the Dicasterial Building (German: Dikasterialgebäude) between 1738 and 1749. Designed by Balthasar Neumann (1687–1753) and supervised by his pupil Johannes Seiz (1717–1779), this structure served as the central administration of the Electorate. Adjacent to the Dicasterial Building, the so-called Curved Stables (German: Krummstall) were erected between 1744 and 1747 to provide accommodations for soldiers, personnel, and workshops. At the same time, Balthasar Neumann designed the Schönbornslust palace as a new summer residence for Franz Georg.

Following Franz Georg's reign, his successor Johann IX Philipp von Walderdorff (1701–1768) expanded the palace complex between 1762 and 1763 by adding new stables adjacent to the Dicasterial Building. These stables (German: Marstall) were also designed by Johannes Seiz.

During a visit in February 1761, Clemens August of Bavaria, Prince-Elector of Cologne and a Grand Master of the Teutonic Order, died at Schloss Philippsburg.

=== Clemens Wenzeslaus of Saxony moves his residence to the opposite bank ===
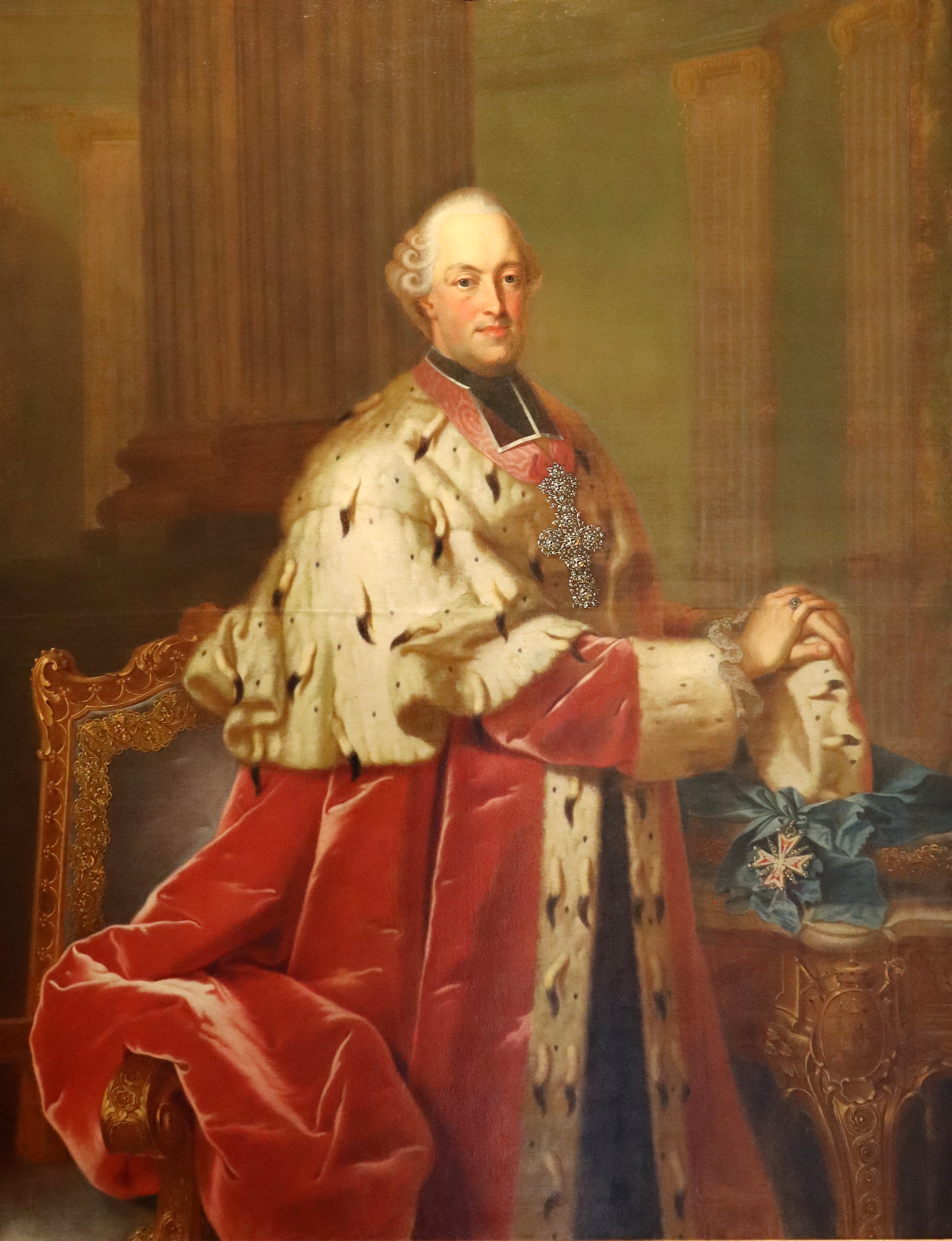
Clemens Wenzeslaus of Saxony

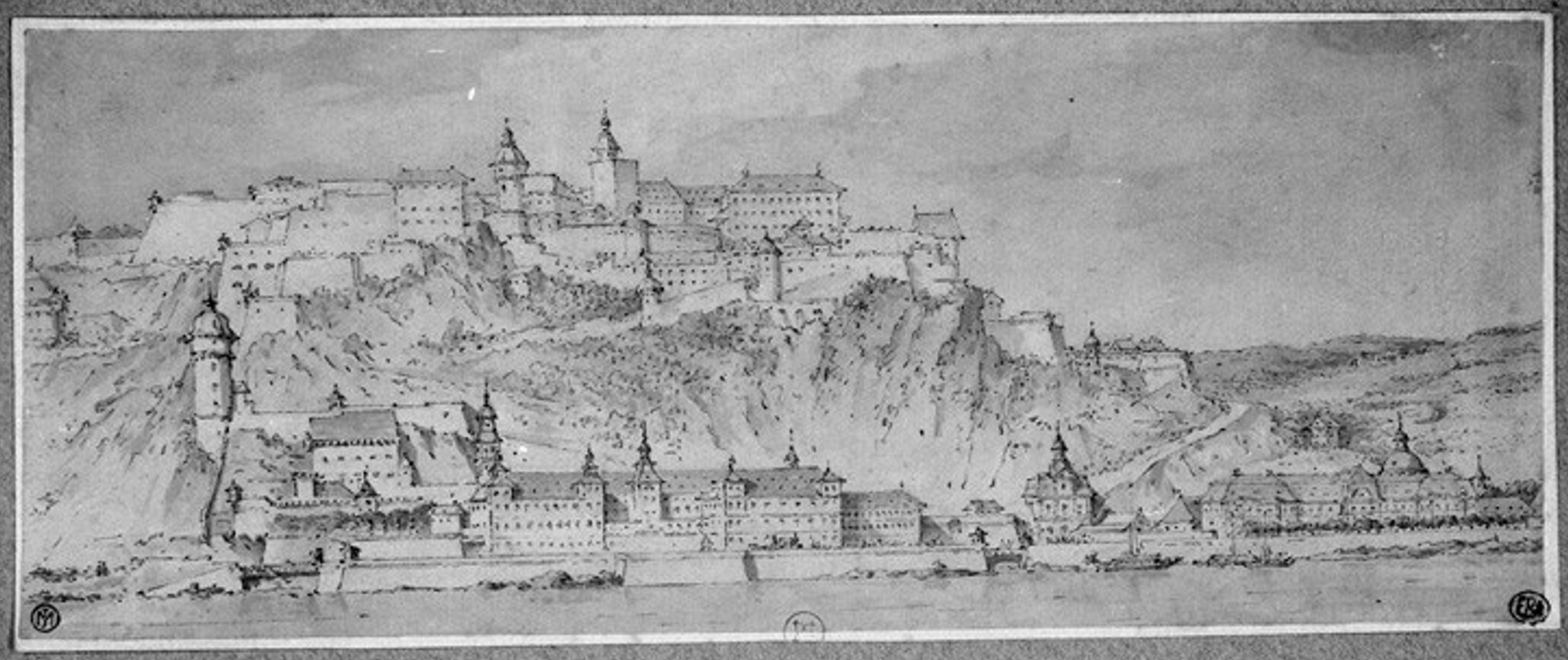
18th century engraving showing the Ehrenbreitstein and the Philippsburg (Bibliotheque of the Beaux-Arts de Paris)

Johannes Seiz made several proposals for redesigning Philippsburg Palace in 1776, which can still be admired in the Koblenz State Archive (German: Landeshauptarchiv Koblenz). However, these proposals remained in the design phase and were never realized. Instead, Clemens Wenzeslaus decided to construct a new palace on the other side of the Rhine River in Koblenz. Pierre Michel d’Ixnard designed this new palace in the neoclassical style.

From 1778 to 1786, during the construction of the Electoral Palace in Koblenz, the Dicasterial Building served as the residence of Prince-Elector Clemens Wenzeslaus of Saxony (1739–1812), as he no longer wanted to reside in the Philippsburg due to building damage, poor living conditions, and the risk of rockfalls. Two towers in the southern right wing were demolished due to their poor condition. In 1786, the elector finally moved into the newly built Electoral palace in Koblenz.

In the following years, Philippsburg was only partially used, including by metalworking businesses and as military hospital during the French revolutionary wars. The furniture but also parts of the fixed wall fittings were removed to be reused in the new palace or other Electoral palaces and buildings. Additionally, thefts and general decay affected the largely unused and insufficiently guarded complex. The building steadily deteriorated, so that it was already in very poor condition before its destruction, and individual parts had to be demolished due to dilapidation.

=== Napoleonic times: the palace is being demolished ===
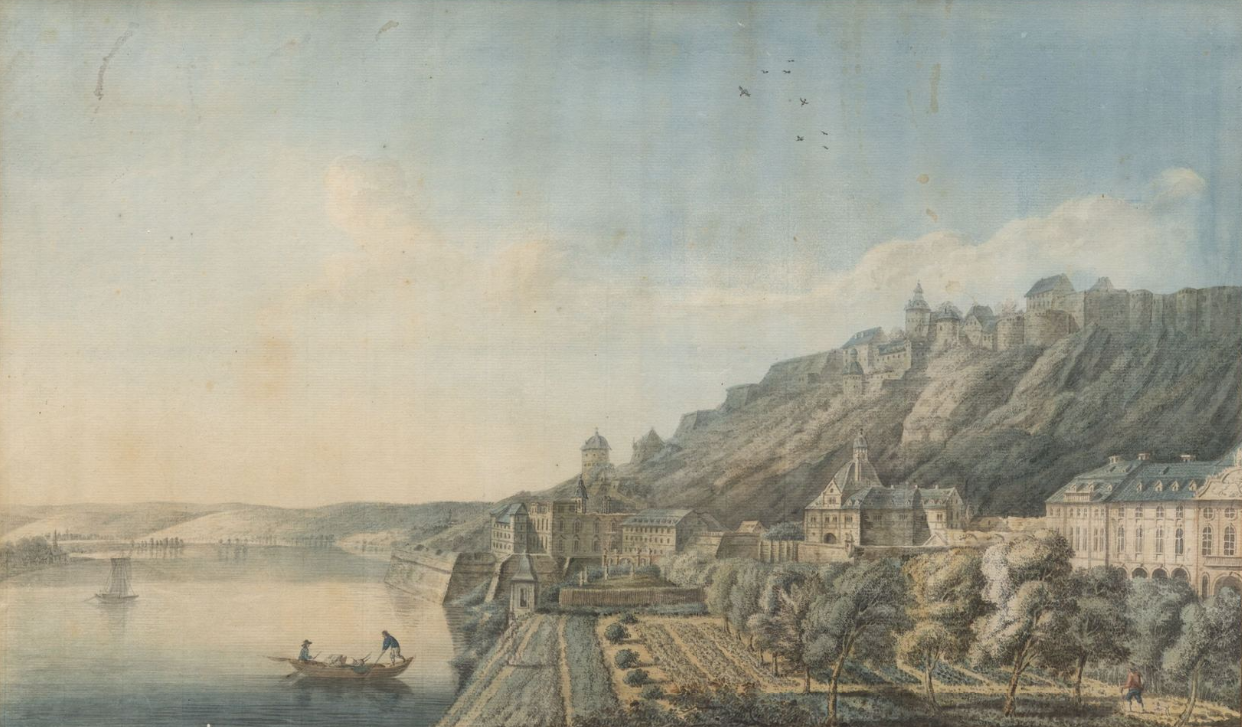
Schloss Philippsburg by Johann Ackerman (1799) Note that the southern wing is in ruins at this time (now in the Goethemuseum in Düsseldorf)

Koblenz was conquered by French revolutionary troops in the First Coalition War in 1794. After four times being sieged, the Ehrenbreitstein Fortress also surrendered in 1799. As the French had to evacuate the areas on the right bank of the Rhine according to the Peace of Lunéville, they blew up the old Electoral fortress on the Ehrenbreitstein beforehand in 1801. The underlying Philippsburg was so severely damaged during the demolition that it had to be demolished. Only a few wall remnants have survived to this day.

Since the 19th century, a road to Vallendar (now B 42) and the right bank railway line have passed over the former palace grounds. However, the Dicasterial Building, Krummstall, Marstall, and Pagerie have remained intact, still hinting at the former glory of the residence. The Prussians used these buildings from 1815 as a coin barracks.

As of 2002, the remaining buildings of the Philippsburg are part of the World Heritage Site and Cultural landscape ‘‘Kulturlandschaft Oberes Mittelrheintal’’.

== Name ==
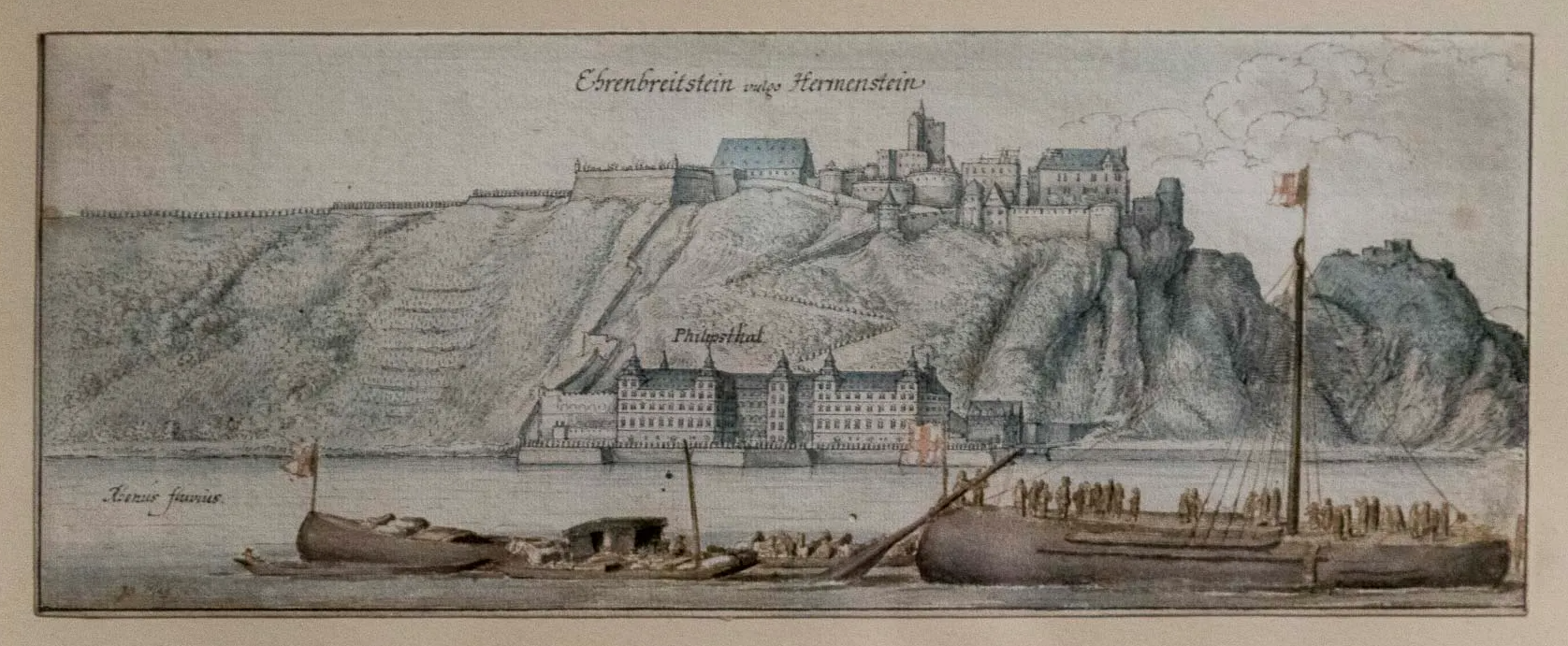
Engraving by Wenceslaus Hollar. On this engraving, the Philippsburg is named Philipsthal

The name ‘‘Philippsburg’’ (English: Philip's castle) likely originated only in the 19th century, following the destruction of the palace, and does not appear in contemporary sources. In some contemporary sources, such as an engraving by Wenceslaus Hollar, the palace is named ‘‘Philipsthal’’ (English: Philip's valley).

== Architecture ==
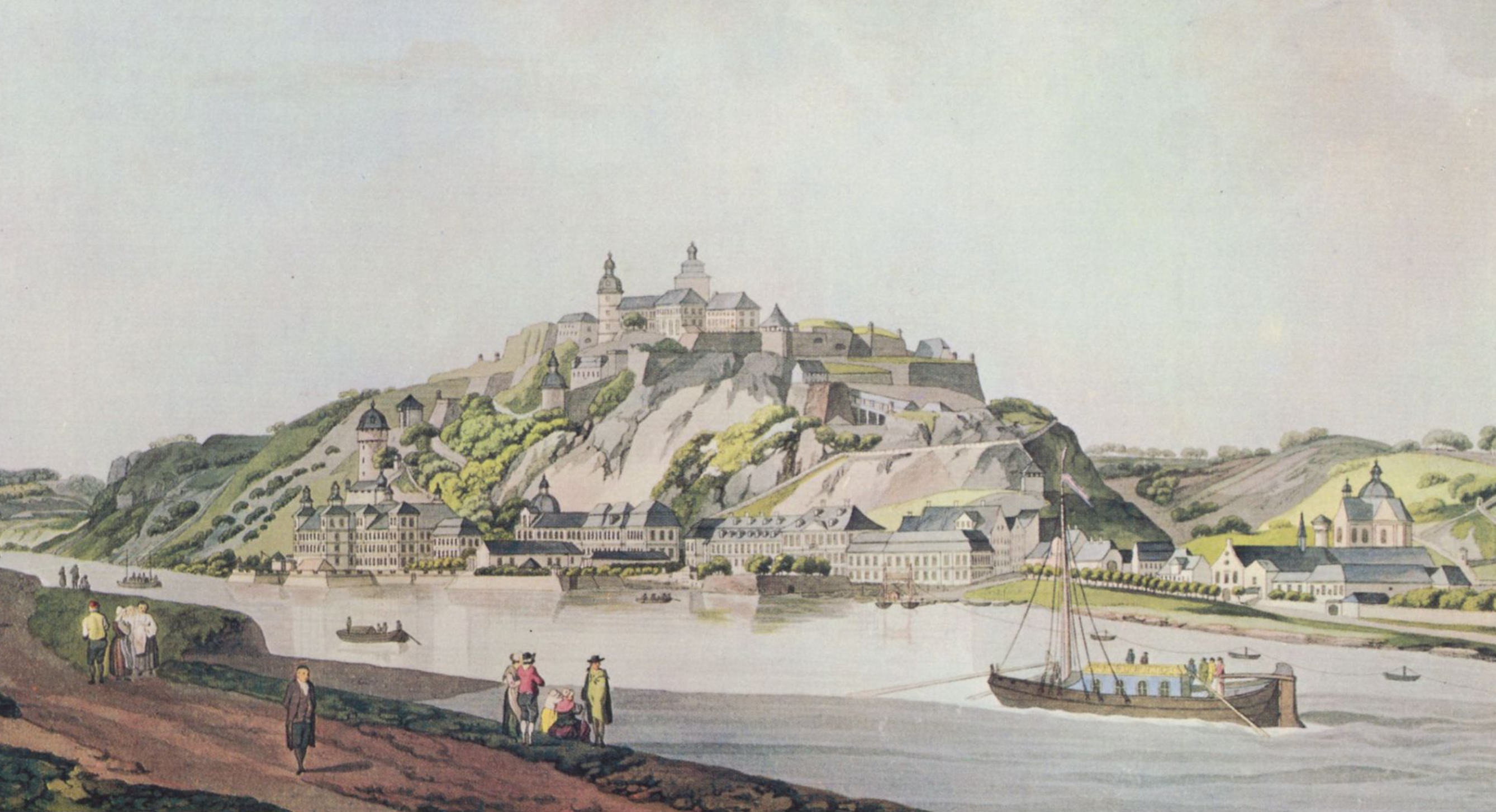
The Ehrenbreitstein fortress and the Philippsburg from the southwest by Johann Andreas Ziegler (1792)

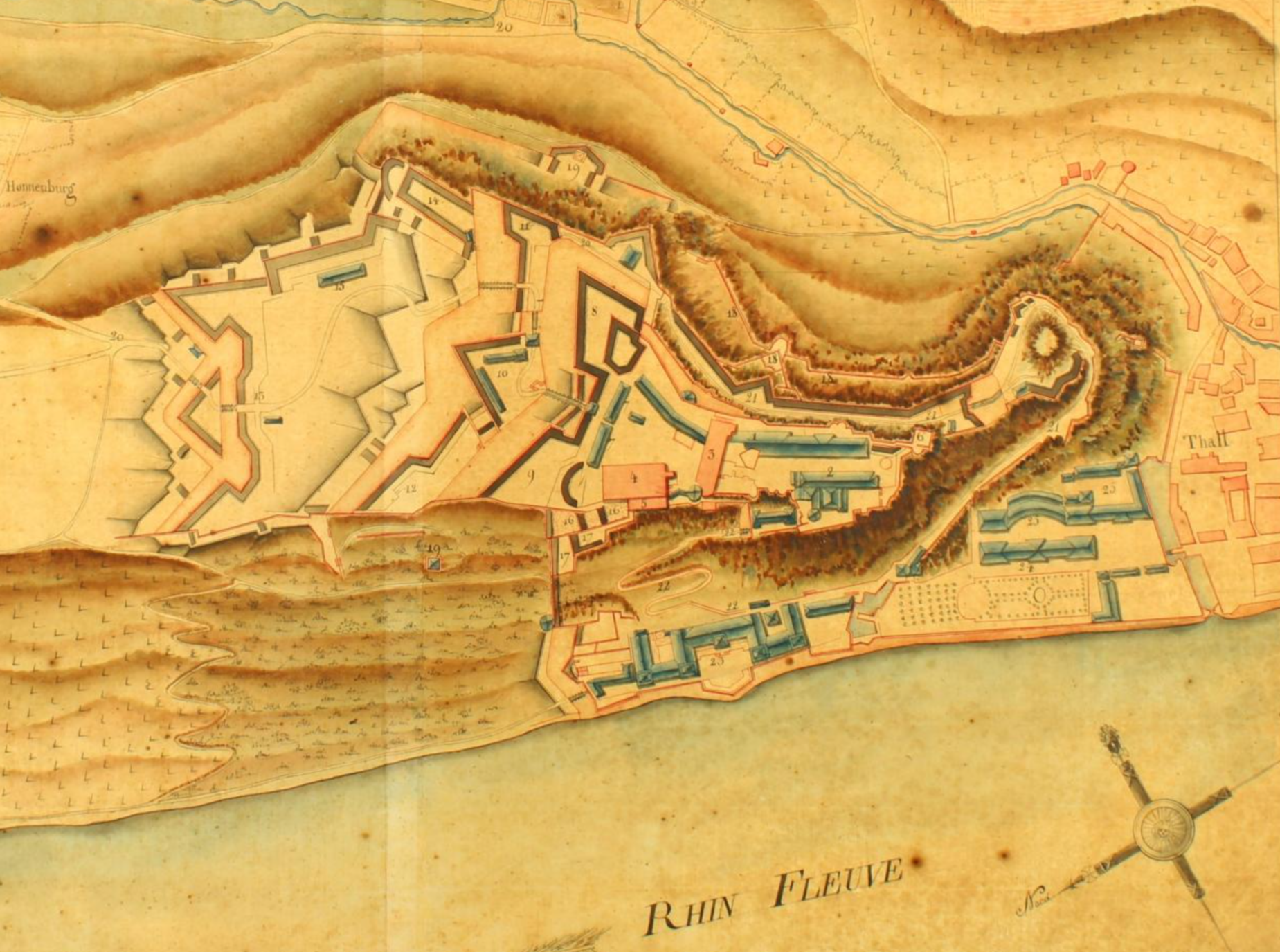
18th century map of the Ehrenbreitstein fortress and Philippsburg palace. Number 23 is the palace. Number 21 is the way going up from the Pagerie to the fortress. Number 23 is the Krumstall. Number 24 is the Dicasterial building. Number 25 are the stables.

=== Philippsburg ===
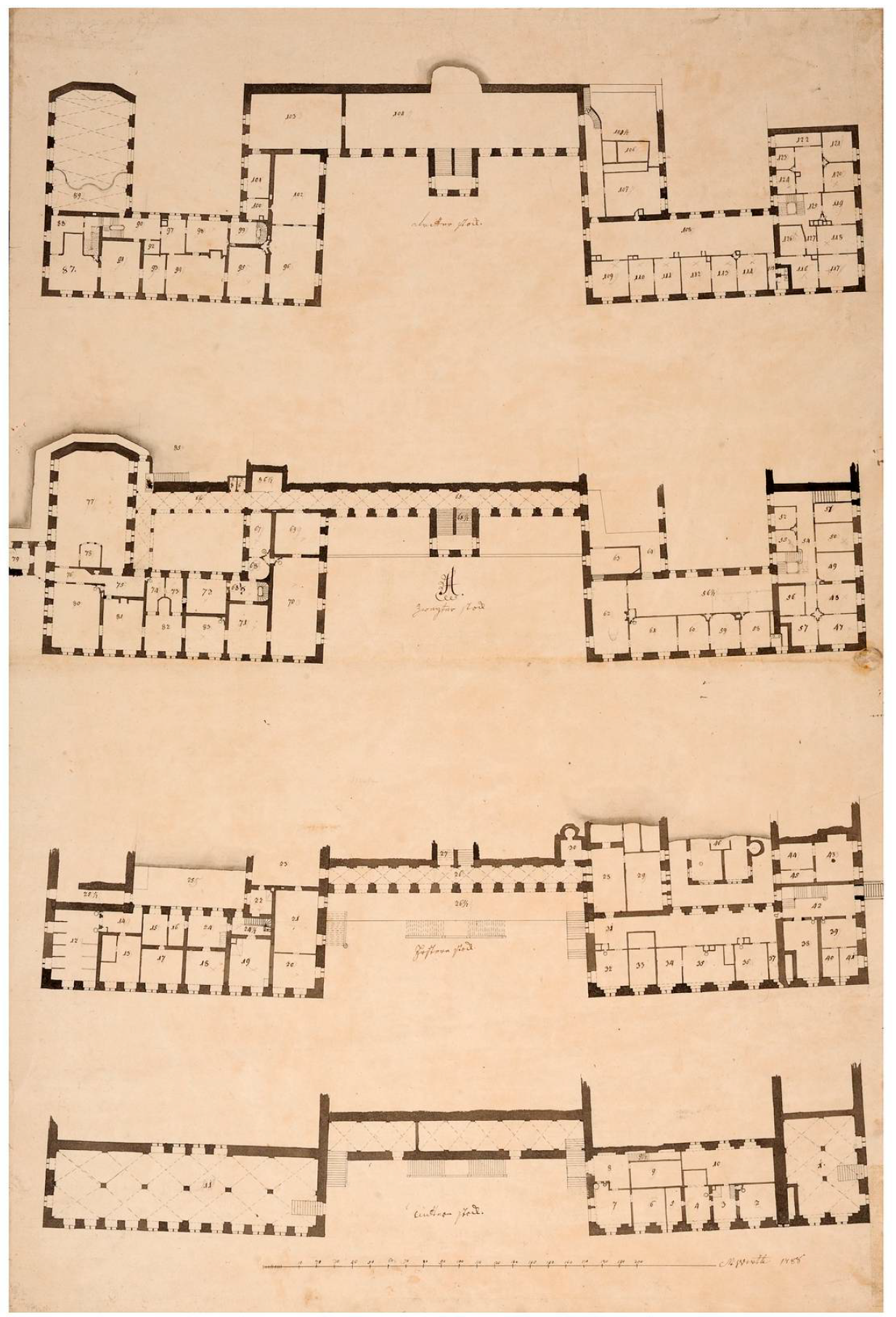
Floorplan of the Philippsburg palace from around 1788 (Landeshauptarchiv Koblenz 702 2318)

The electoral residence was a three-story palace built in the style of early Baroque architecture. The length of the palace measured 160 meters, divided into seven wings surrounding three rectangular courtyards, with the central courtyard opening towards the Rhine, while the lateral courtyards faced the hill of the Ehrenbreitstein fortress. Towering prominently at its four corners were turrets crowned with stepped roofs. They have similarities with the towers of Schloss Johannisburg in Aschaffenburg.

The palace was surrounded by its own bastioned fortifications with moats on the north and south sides As bastioned residential palace, it has similarities with the 'Palazzo in Fortezza' model, where a noble residence is integrated or constructed within a fortress or fortified complex. Similar examples of such structures include the citadel in Jülich, Castle Buren and Breda Castle in the Netherlands, Villa Farnese in Caprarola, Italy, Krzyżtopór castle and Łańcut Castle in Poland. These types of palaces were predominantly constructed during the 16th and 17th centuries.

Most palaces created at the start of the 17th century were closed four wing complexes, such as Schloss Johannisberg or Schloss Weilburg. What the Philippsburg makes special, is that it had an open courtyard facing the Rhine river.

The electoral yacht harbor developed from the southern moat, expanded in 1819 as a protective harbor for the pontoon bridge but was abandoned and filled in 1886.

Philippsburg Palace boasted an outstanding interior decor, which continued to be perfected until the end of the 18th century. Renowned stucco artists, painters, gilders, and sculptors contributed to the high-quality interior decoration. Evidence of this includes the stucco work by Nicolo Carcano and the ceiling painting by Lazaro Maria Sanguinetti in the 400 m^{2} grand ballroom on the third floor. Sanguinetti also painted frescoes in the antechamber and five other rooms. Carlo Maria Pozzi was also involved as a stucco artist in the palace. Parts of this interior decoration, especially from the courtyard chapel, were transferred to churches in the surrounding area after the demolition of the palace in 1799.

==== Gallery: Propopsals and designs for reconstructing the Philippsburg at the Koblenz State Archive (Landeshauptarchiv Koblenz) ====
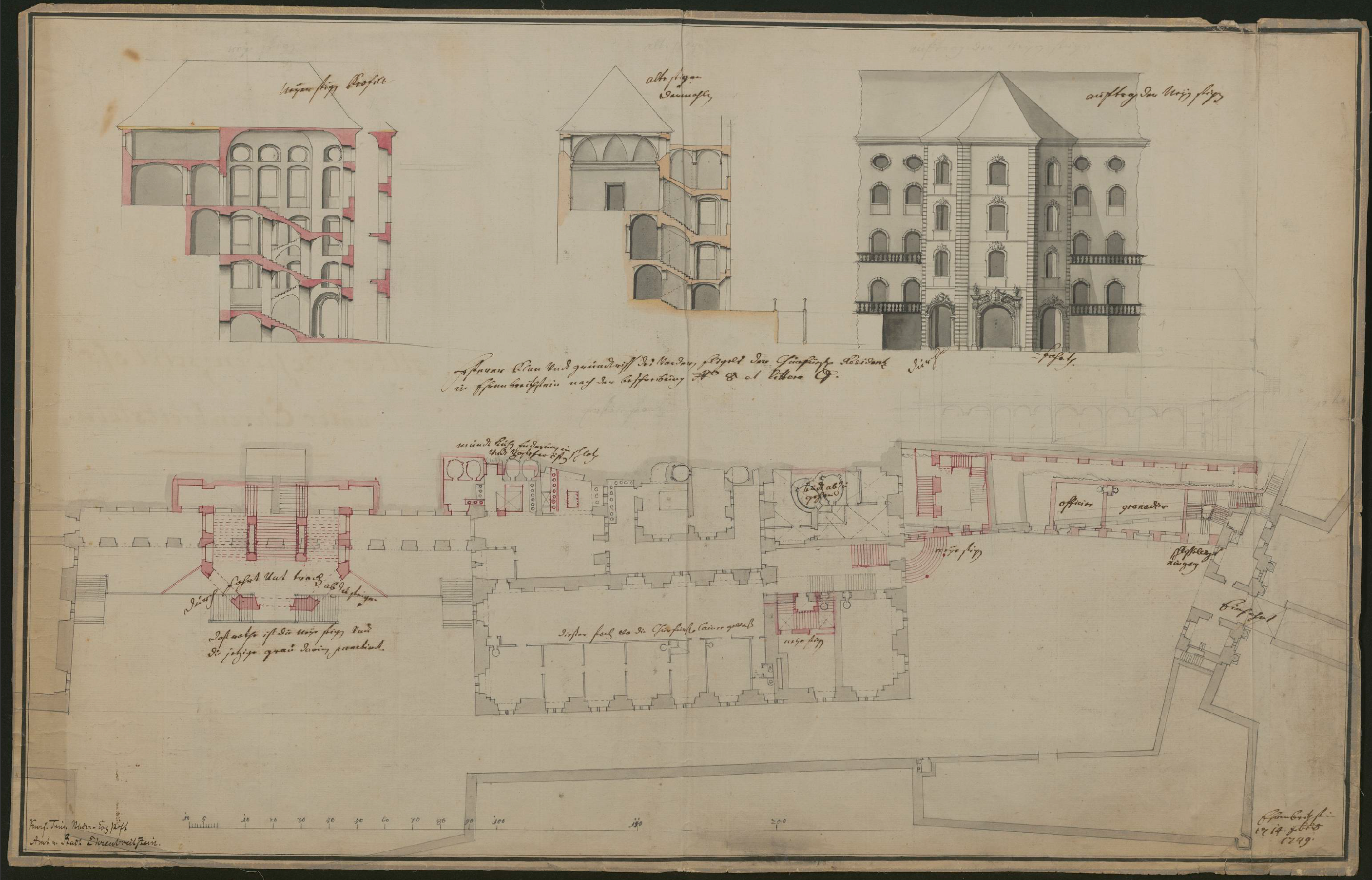
Proposal to redesign the staircase tower in the main building from Johannes Seiz with commentary by Balthasar Neumann (1749)(Landeshauptarchiv Koblenz 702 141)

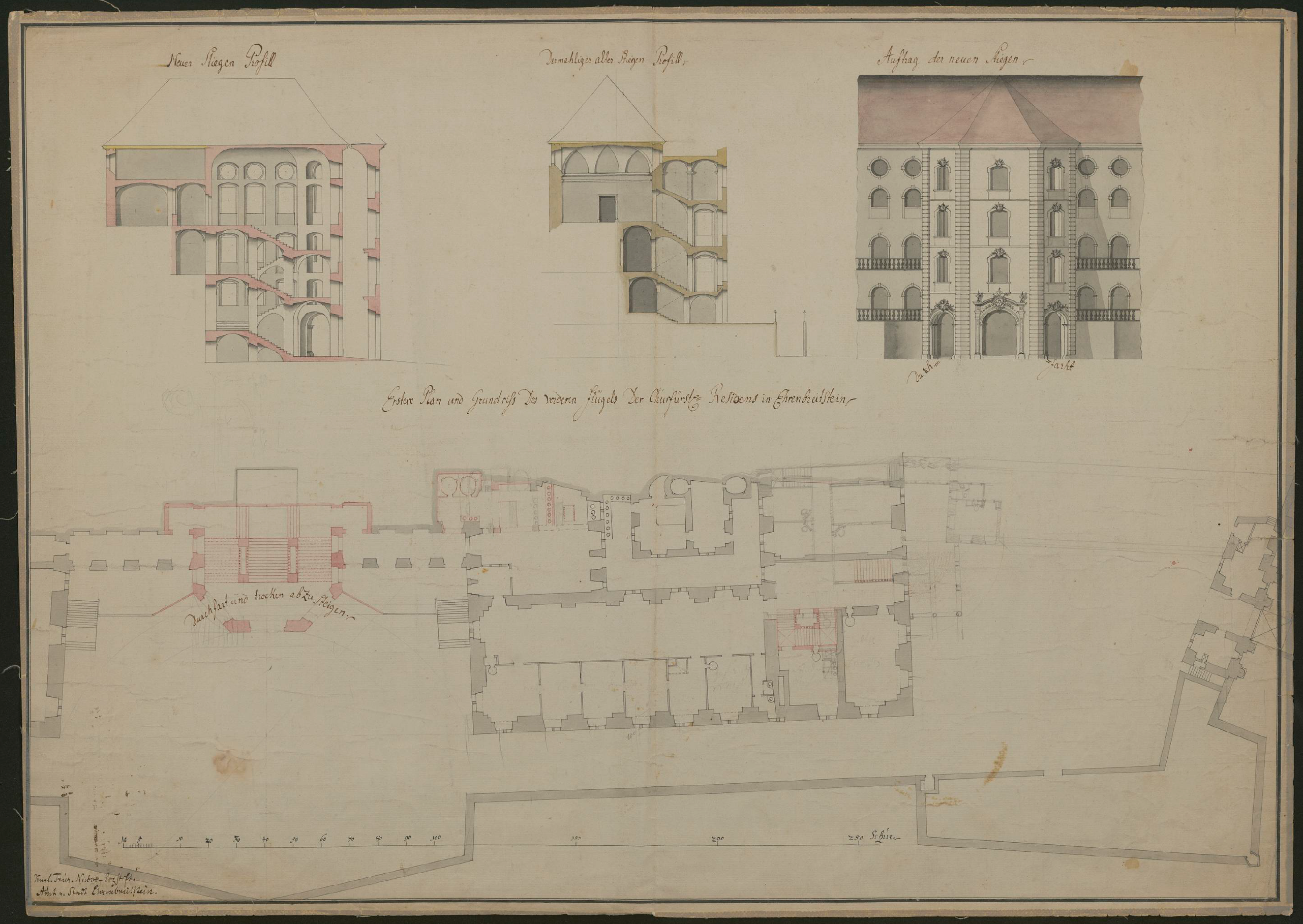
Proposal to redesign the staircase tower in the main building from Johannes Seiz with commentary by Balthasar Neumann (1749)(Landeshauptarchiv Koblenz 702 142)

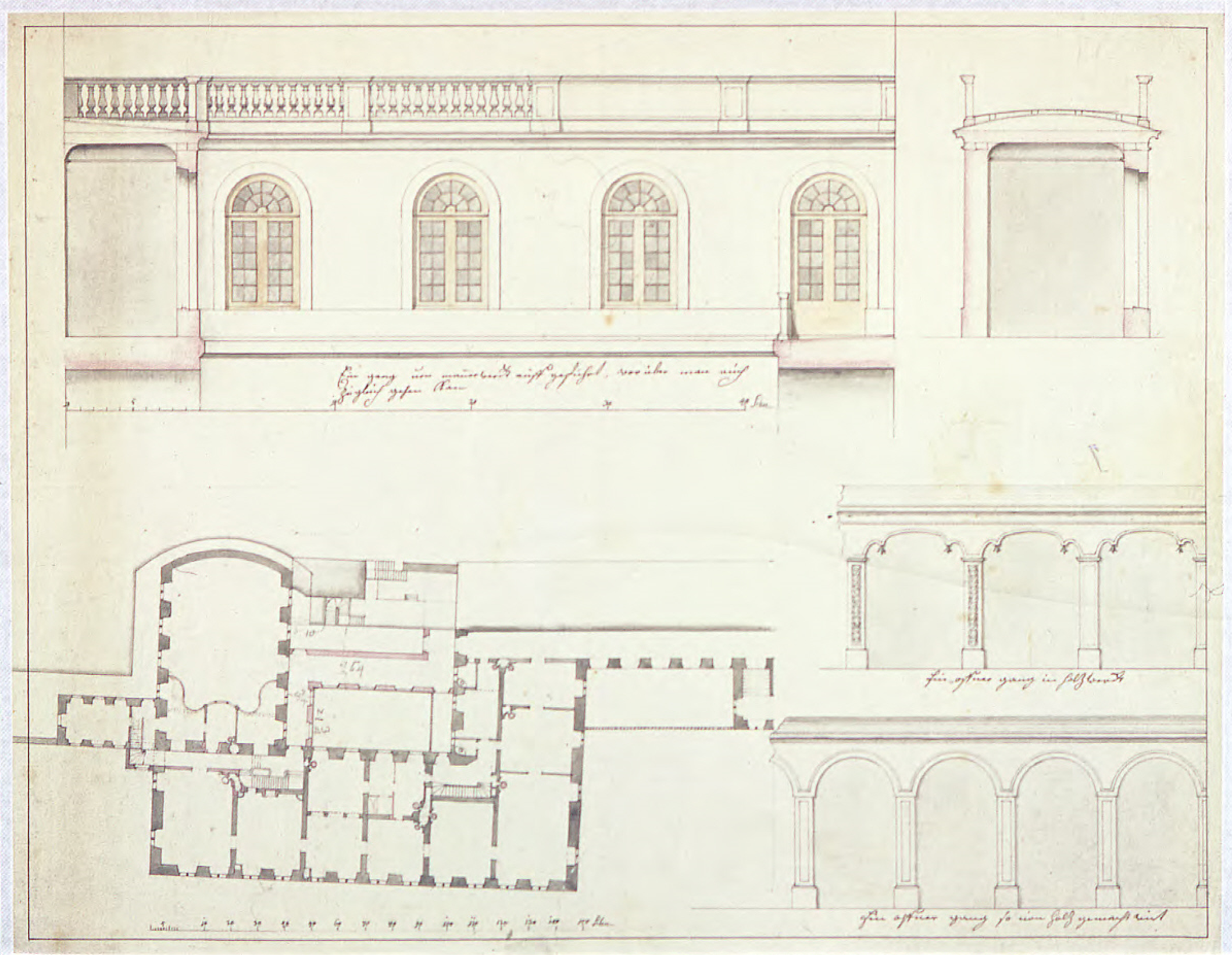
Design proposal for the northern left wing (Landeshauptarchiv Koblenz 702 2302)

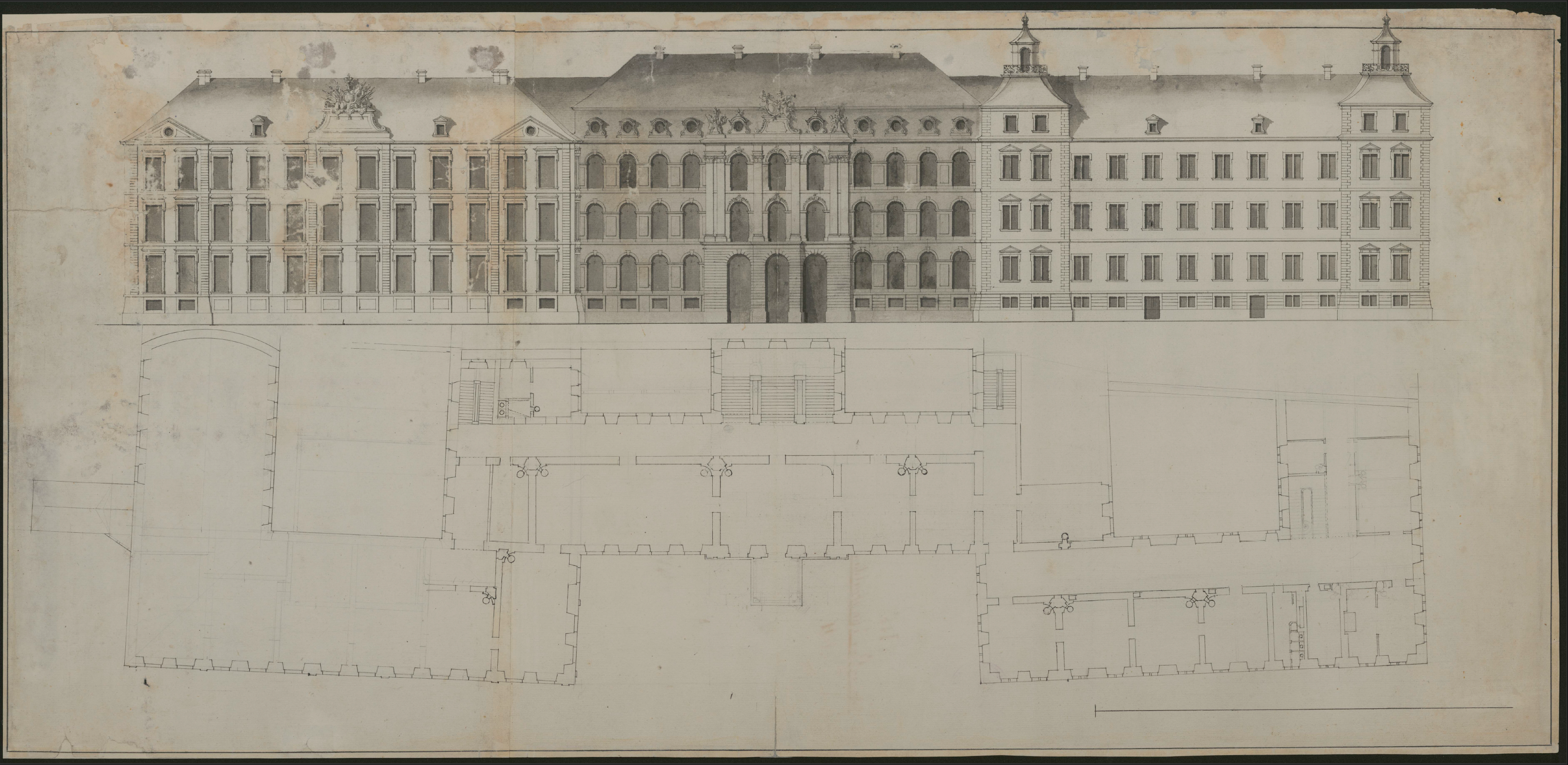
Facade redesign proposal by Johannes Seiz (1776)(Landeshauptarchiv Koblenz 702 153)

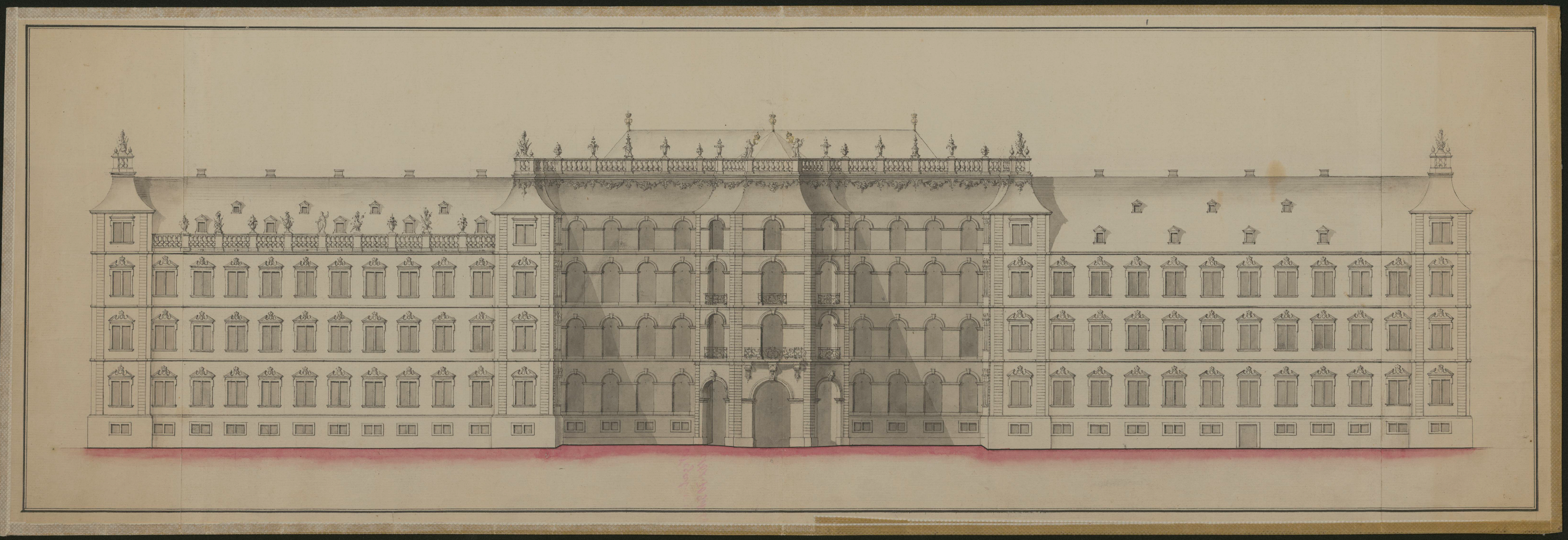
Facade redesign proposal by Johannes Seiz (1776)(Landeshauptarchiv Koblenz 702 144)

=== Pagerie ===
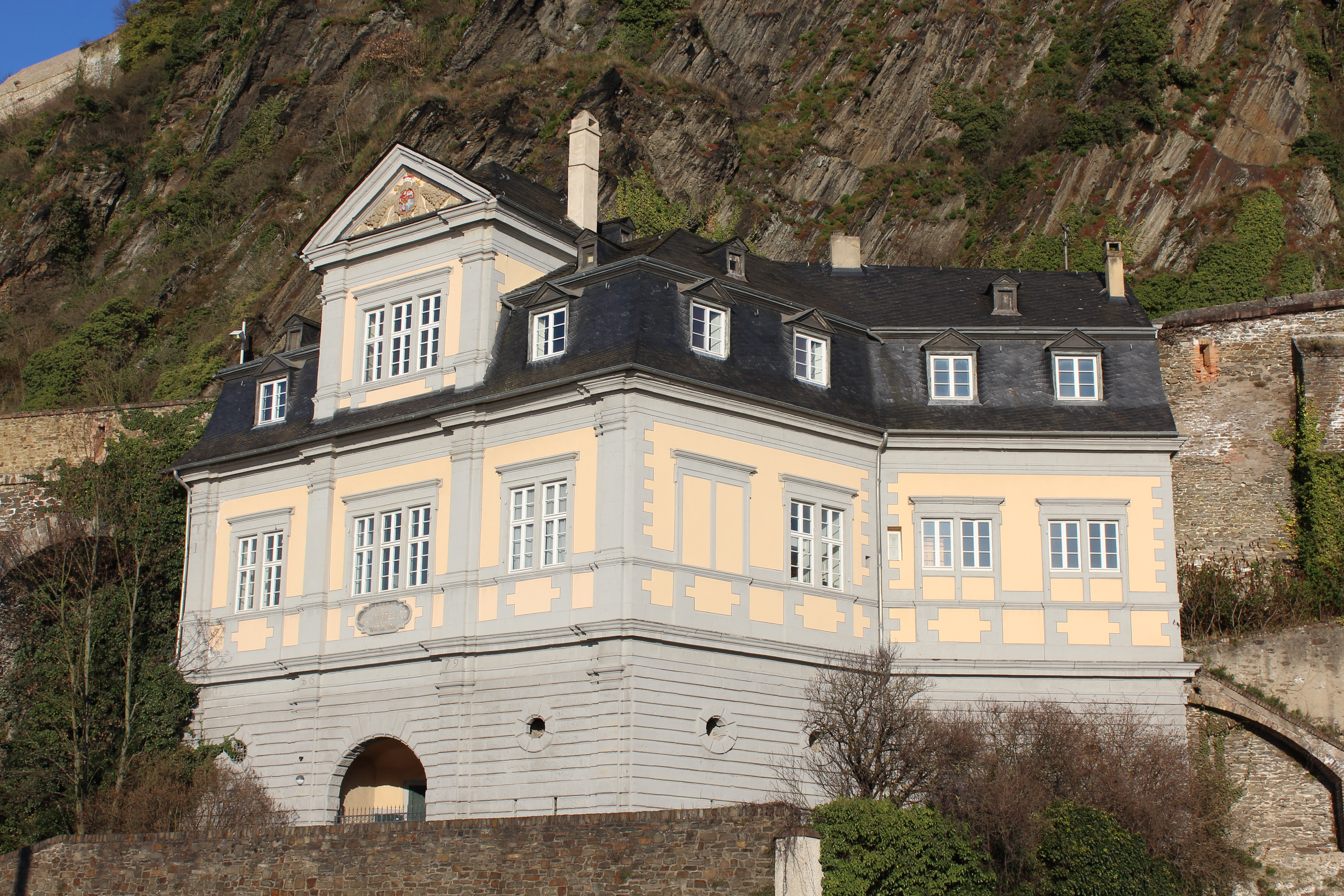
The Pagerie (around 2015)

The Pagerie is situated south of the former Philippsburg palace and was constructed as a fortress gatehouse along the path leading up to Ehrenbreitstein Fortress. It stands as the sole surviving structure of the baroque fortress from the Electoral period.

The main building, positioned perpendicular to the path and parallel to the slope, features an annex with an obtuse angle. A plaque above the gate, set in the parapet of the window directly above it, commemorates the construction of the path by Prince-Elector Karl Kaspar von der Leyen. The gate, resembling a portcullis, is set within a tall and uniformly rusticated basement level. The three-axis main floor above is generously fenestrated, with its central axis projecting upward as a dormer before continuing into the mansard roof, added only in 1801. The gable bears the coat of arms of Prince-Elector Johann Hugo von Orsbeck. The gray and yellow painted facade of the baroque plaster structure is adorned with pilasters. Inside, a stone spiral staircase, crafted by Master Lorenz Staudacher, features steps made of black marble and a profiled handrail. For the straight staircase leading to the basement, old stones from the demolished palace were repurposed for repair purposes.

Initially utilized as the New Chancellery, the rooms later served as residences for knights, then as living and schooling quarters for pages under Elector Clemens Wenzeslaus of Saxony, and eventually as an orphanage.

With the construction of the Prussian Ehrenbreitstein Fortress at the beginning of the 19th century, the path was rebuilt with a shallower incline, passing directly behind the Pagerie. In the process, the path was carved into the northern corner of the building.

=== Dicasterial Building (Dikasterialgebäude) ===
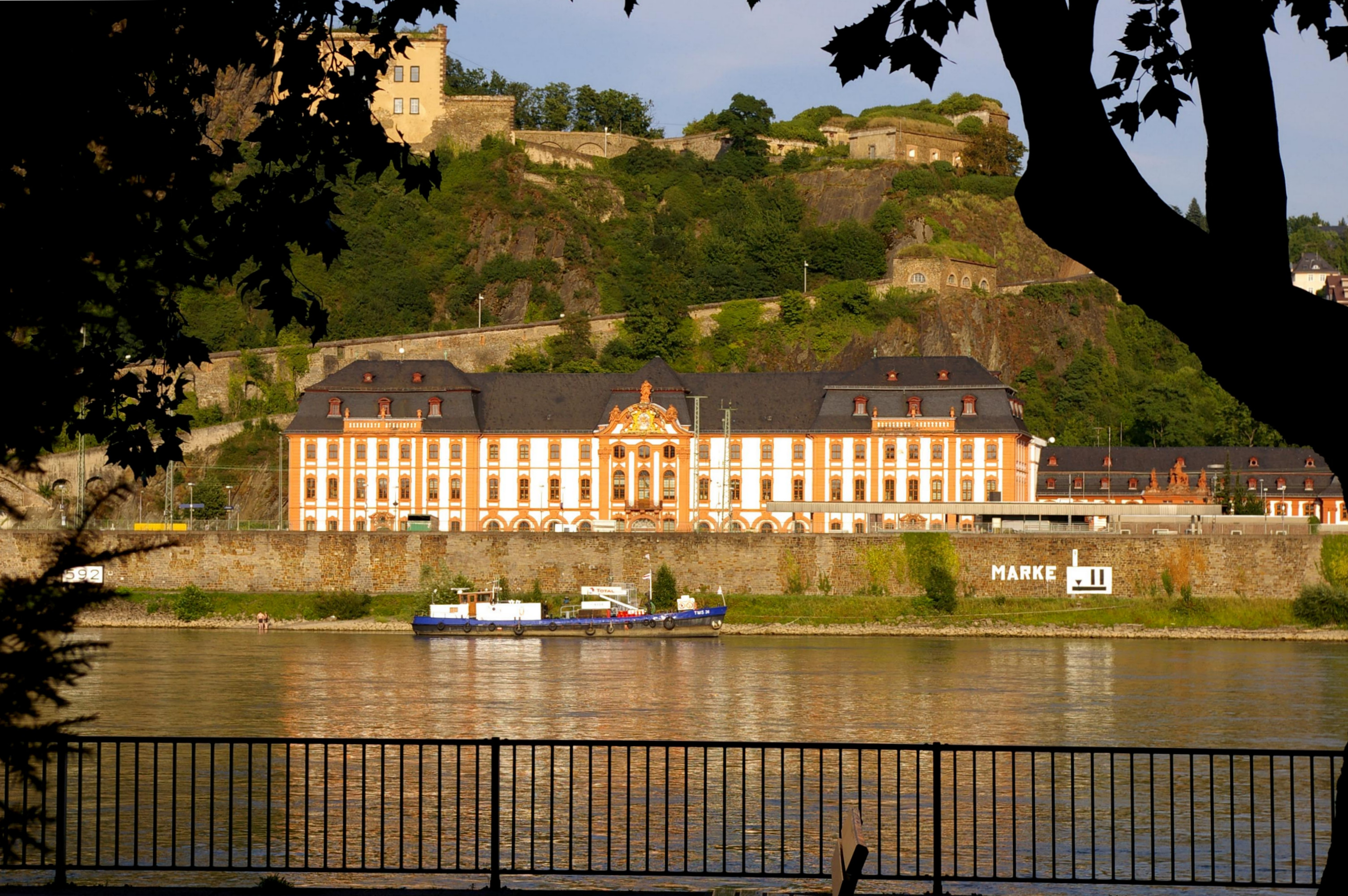
The Dicasterial Building from a distance (around 2008)

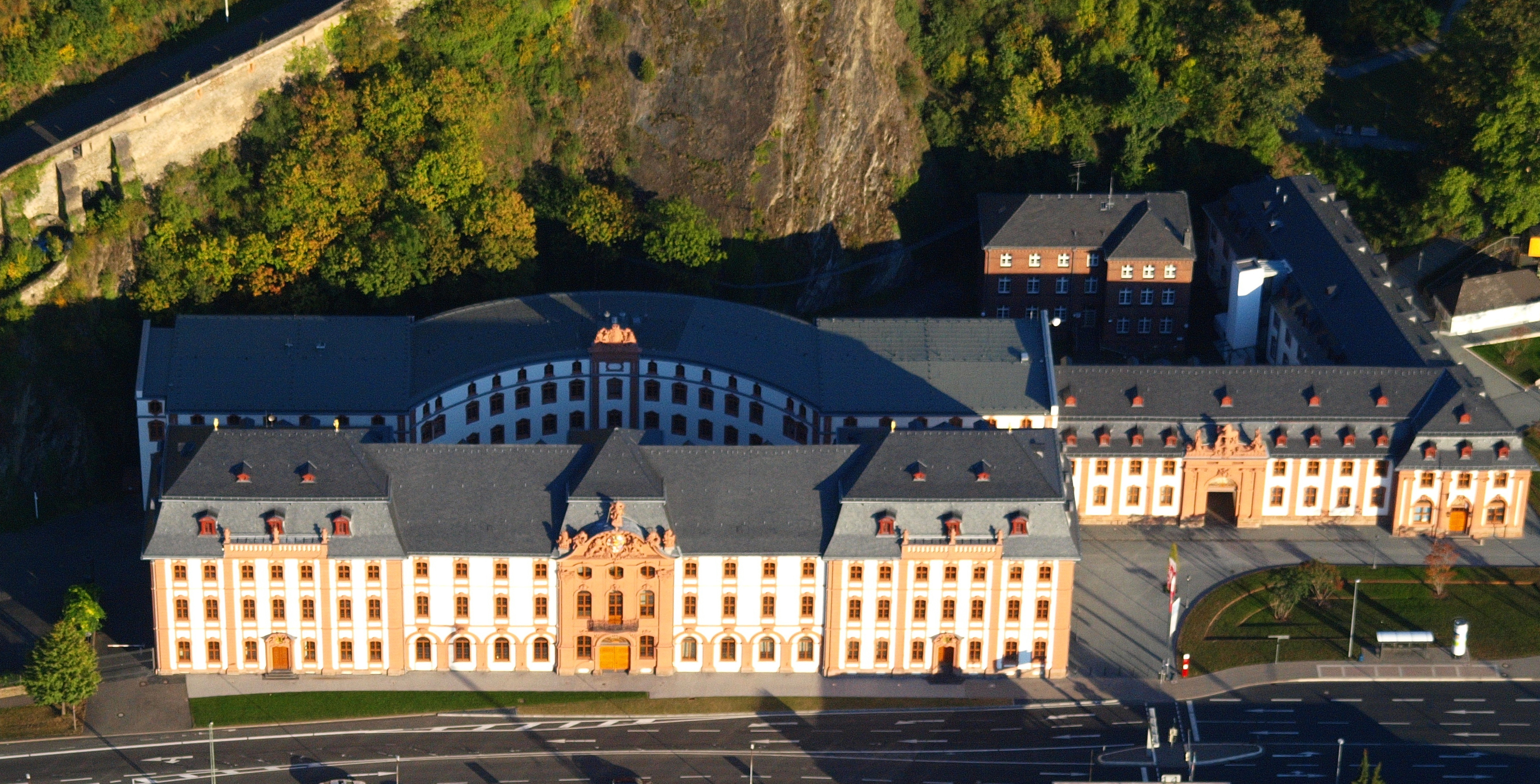
Aerial view of the Dicasterial Building, with the curved stables at its back and the stables to the right (around 2011)

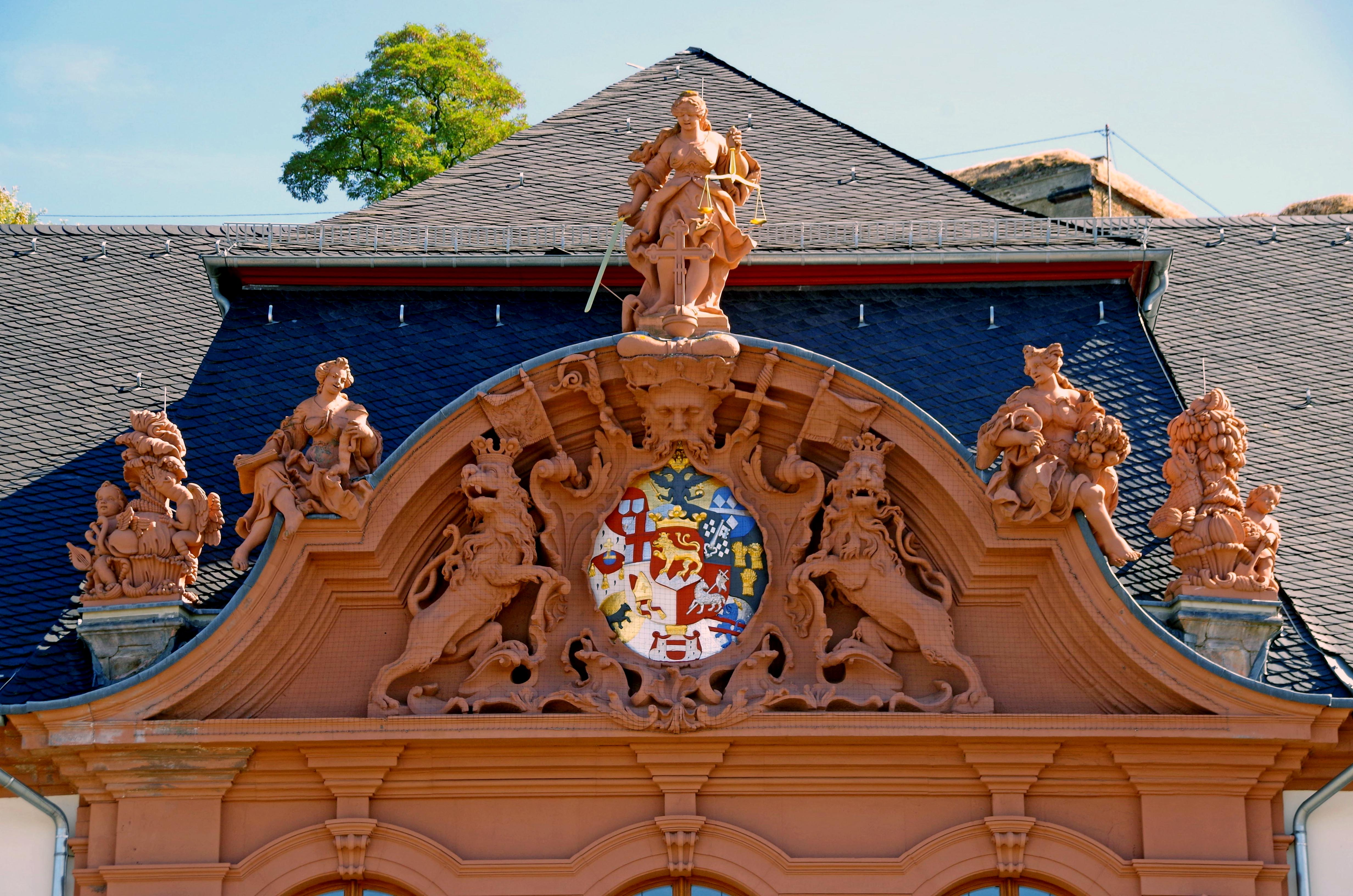
The coat of arms of Franz Georg von Schönborn at the Dicasterial Building

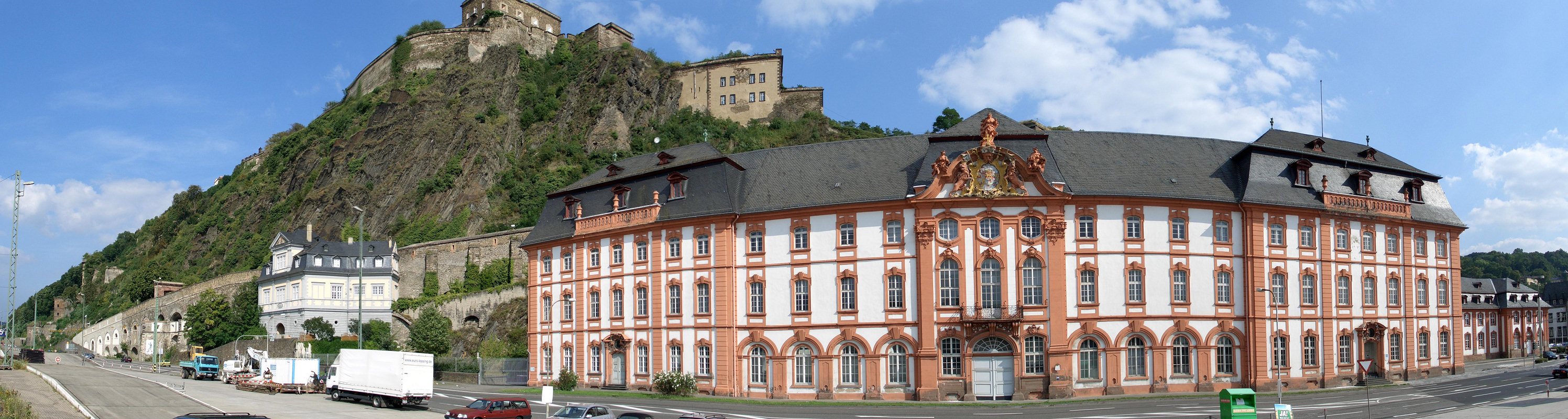
The Dicasterial Building with the Pagerie to its left (around 2011)

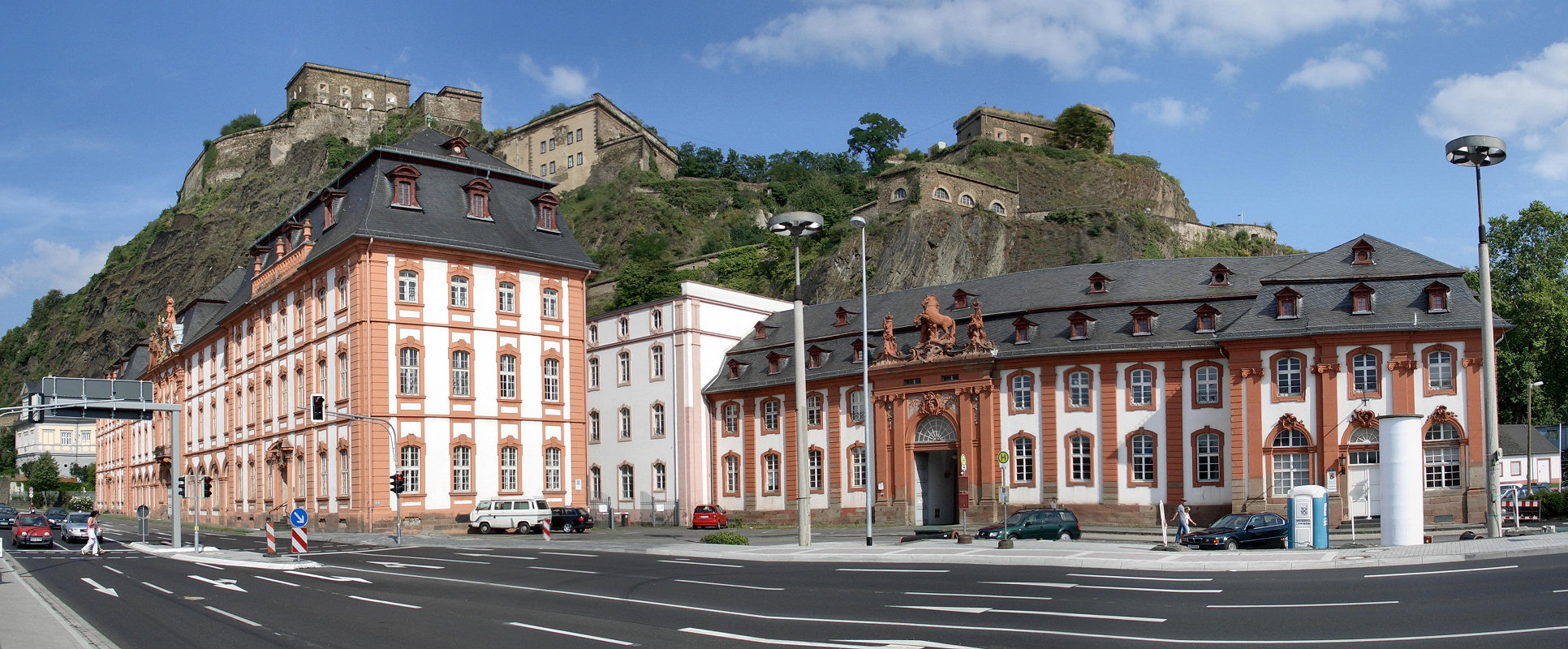
The Dicasterial Building, with the curved stables at its back and the stables to the right (around 2011)

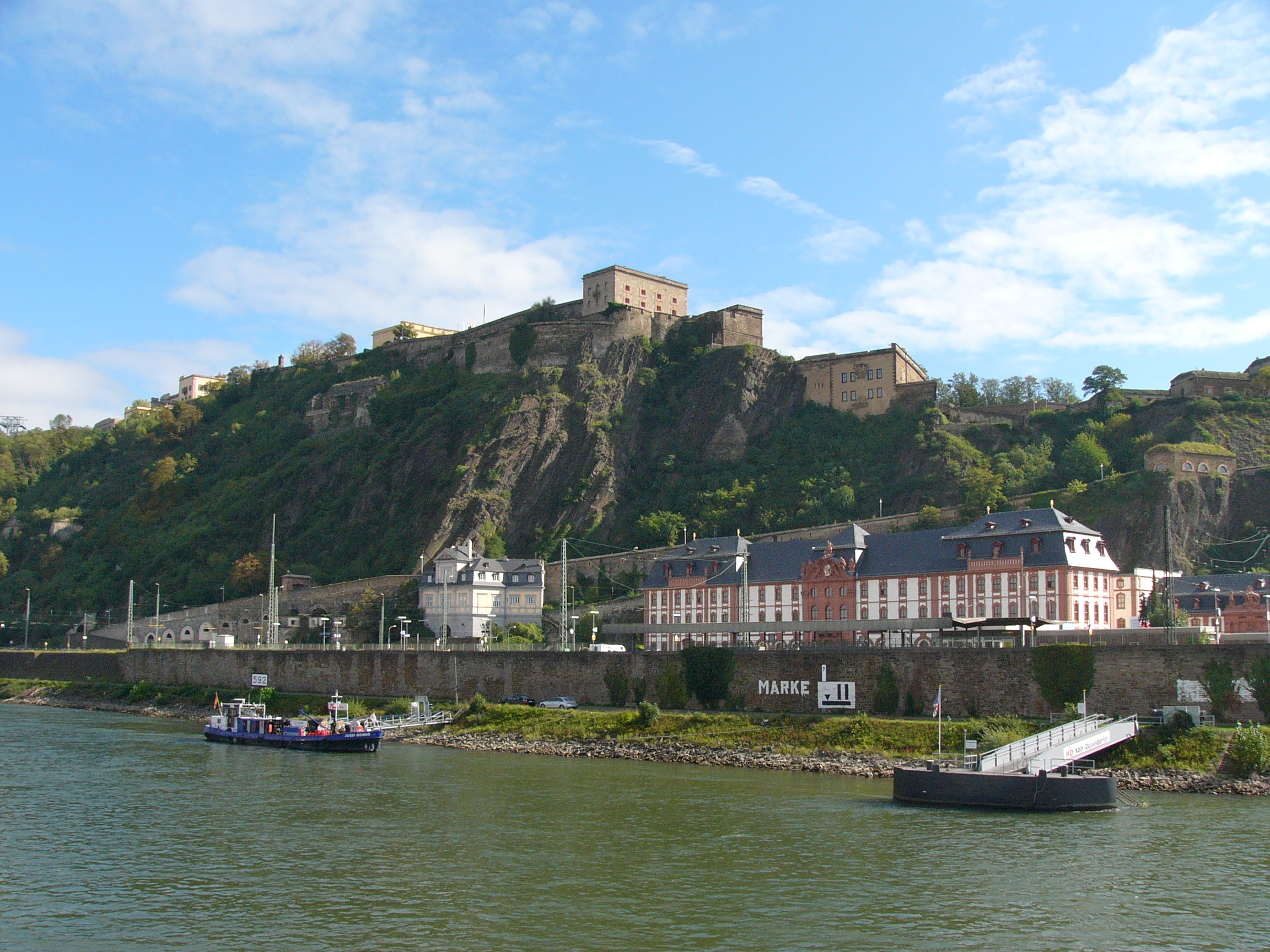
The Dicasterial Building with the Pagerie to its left (around 2011)

The former governmental and administrative building of the Electorate is a three-story structure oriented parallel to the Rhine. The layout, measuring 25:4 axes, features flat central and corner projections, as well as a gabled roof with mansard roofs over the projections. The segmental-arched windows are grouped into columns. The corner projections, each spanning seven axes, are framed by full-height rusticated pilasters, with a pilaster-framed entrance and pediment in the center of each. The central three axes of the roof zone boast a balustrade row with vase finials. The three-axis central projection, featuring smooth pilasters, houses the main entrance and sports a pediment with a broken curved contour, displaying the coat of arms of Prince-Elector Franz Georg von Schönborn held by crowned double-tailed lions. The pediment is crowned by three figures representing the personifications of Science, Justice, and Agriculture (from left to right). Additionally, exterior putti with their corresponding attributes adorn the building. Behind the larger round-arched windows in the center, which have a preceding balcony with wrought-iron grilles, lies the ballroom.

Internally, all rooms are vaulted, except for those on the first and second floors at the rear, which were destroyed by a bomb strike during the air raids on Koblenz. The staircases are built into the rear corners of the building and adorned with protruding terminal pilasters. Nothing remains of the original interior furnishings.

=== Curved Stables (Krummstall) ===
The Curved Stables are located behind the Dicasterial Building. It is a plain three-story structure with 41 axes, of which the central 15 axes curve backward in a segmental layout. A lower floor was added in 1880. The segmental-arched windows are framed in a different color. The edges of the building and the central axis are adorned with pilasters. In the center, a cartouche with the electoral coat of arms is mounted. The ground floor features cross-vaulting, partially supported by cast iron columns.

=== Stables (Marstall) ===
South of the Curved Stables, the stables are situated. This two-story building with a mansard roof features two wings angled sharply towards each other, with the rear wing marking the northern boundary of the electoral yacht harbor. The wing facing the Rhine accommodates the main entrance, adorned with Ionic double pilasters. Above it, a prominent entablature stands out, supporting a fully sculpted group of a rearing horse with a stable boy, flanked by obelisks bearing flags, instruments, and the Electoral hat, all standing free before the roof. The structure, adorned with rusticating pilasters, reflects the design of the Dicasterial Building. The ground floor, originally housing 69 horse stalls, is vaulted with cross-ribbed vaults, supported by robust Tuscan columns made of basalt.

== See also ==
Other palaces, residences and hunting lodges of the Prince-Electors of Trier:

- Electoral Palace, Koblenz
- Electoral Palace, Trier
- The yellow castle of Montabaur
- Schloss Engers
- Schloss Kärlich
- Schloss Philippsfreude
- Schloss Schönbornslust

== Literature ==
- Bátori, Ingrid; Kerber, Dieter; Schmidt, Hans Josef, eds. (1992). Geschichte der Stadt Koblenz – Band 1: Von den Anfängen bis zum Ende der kurfürstlichen Zeit (in German). Stuttgart: Theiss Verlag. ISBN 3-8062-0876-X.
- Bátori, Ingrid; Kerber, Dieter; Schmidt, Hans Josef, eds. (1993). Geschichte der Stadt Koblenz – Band 2: Von der französischen Stadt bis zur Gegenwart (in German). Stuttgart: Theiss Verlag. ISBN 3-8062-1036-5.
- Die Kunstdenkmäler der Stadt Koblenz. Die profanen Denkmäler und die Vororte (Reihe: Die Kunstdenkmäler von Rheinland-Pfalz) (in German). München/ Berlin: Deutscher Kunstverlag/ Landesamt für Denkmalpflege Rheinland-Pfalz. 1986. ISBN 3-422-00563-3.
- Schwickerath, Marianne (1992). Wo stand eigentlich die Philippsburg? Die ehemalige kurfürstliche Residenz in Ehrenbreitstein (in German). Koblenz: Görres-Verlag. p. 237. ISBN 978-3923532131.
- Gondorf, Bernhard (1995). "Der ehemalige Hofgarten in Koblenz-Ehrenbreitstein". Die Gartenkunst (in German). 7: 163–166.
- Restorff, Jörg (1998). "die Schloss- und Residenzbautätigkeit des kurtrierischen Hofarchitekten Johannes Seiz (1717-1719) unter Johann Philipp von Walderdorff". In Jürgensmeier, Friedhelm (ed.). Die von Walderdorff Acht Jahrhunderte Wechselbeziehungen zwischen Region - Reich - Kirche und einem rheinischen Adelsgeschlecht (in German). Köln: Verlag des Rheinischen Vereins für Denkmalpflege und Landschaftsschutz. pp. 271–296. ISBN 3-88094-832-1.
- Backes, Magnus (1999). Wegweiser Mittelrhein Spätrenaissance und Barock (in German). Koblenz: Görres-Verlag. ISBN 3-920388-71-2.
- Weber, Ulrike, ed. (2013). Kulturdenkmäler in Rheinland-Pfalz. Denkmaltopographie Bundesrepublik Deutschland. Band 3.3: Stadt Koblenz. Stadtteile (in German). Worms: Wernersche Verlag. ISBN 978-3-88462-345-9.
