= Karl Kaspar von der Leyen =

- Archbishop of Trier
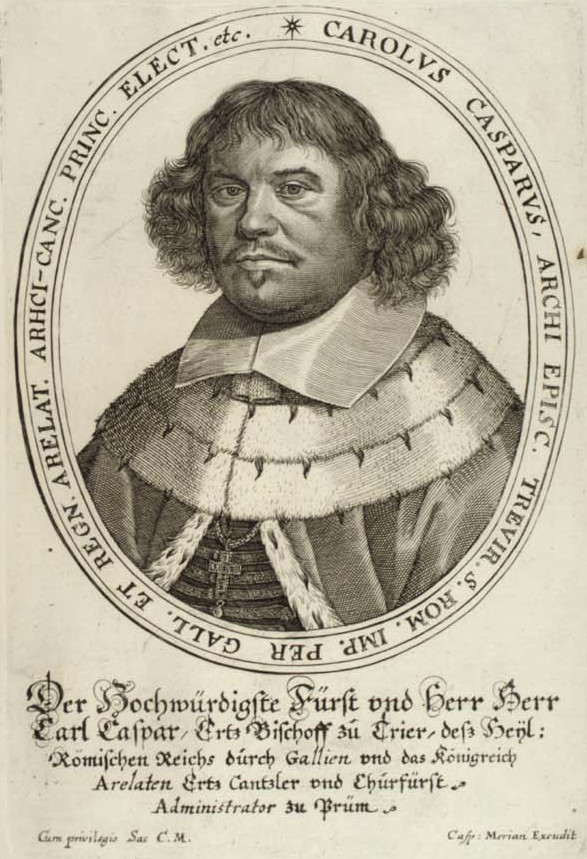
- Karl von der Leyen Kaspar, engraving from a coronation leaflet from the year 1658
- Church: Catholic Church
- Diocese: Electorate of Trier
- In office: 1652–1676

Orders
- Ordination: 1 September 1641 (Deacon); 10 September 1652 (Priest)
- Consecration: September 1652 by Otto von Senheim

Personal details
- Born: 18 December 1618
- Died: 1 June 1676 (aged 57)

Karl Kaspar von der Leyen (18 December 1618 – 1 June 1676) was Archbishop-Elector of Trier and a Prince-Elector of the Holy Roman Empire from 1652 to 1676.

== Life ==
A member of the noble Leyen family, Charles Kaspar was made a coadjutor bishop on 11 June 1650. He was elected the successor of the then 86-year-old Archbishop Philipp Christoph von Sötern, but this was rejected as Philipp Christoph was the favoured candidate.

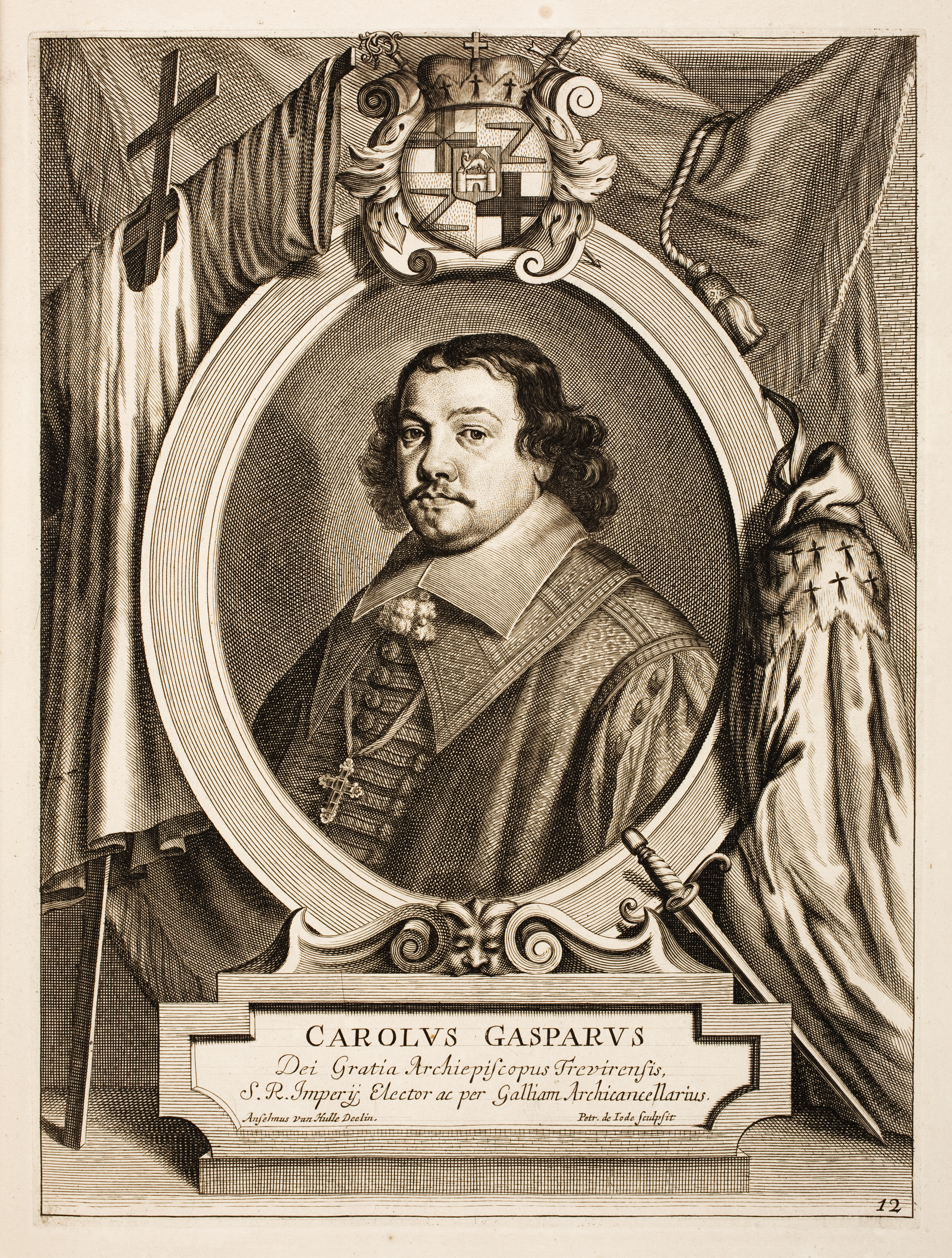
Engraving of Karl Kaspar

After the death of the Archbishop, Karl Kaspar started his reign on 12 March 1652. The consequences of the recently ended Thirty Years' War presented the new archbishop with many hard tasks, for example, the population of the archiepiscopal state had declined to approximately 300,000 people. His policy towards the Allies had destroyed many buildings; so he had to restore the country's infrastructure, especially the justice and agriculture systems, to promote development. He also had to repair the fortresses Koblenz and Ehrenbreitstein.

He founded an orphanage for boys in Trier and endowed scholarships for the training of nobles' sons to become priests, and in 1668, he had the Kurtrierische Landrecht ("Electoral-Trier Common Law") published.

Charles Kaspar promoted, in particular, the members of his aristocratic house, Von der Leyen (House of the Leyens).

In 1654 he made his younger brother Damian Hartard von der Leyen (later Archbishop of Mainz and Sovereign of the Electorate of Mainz) the Provost and Archdeacon of Karden, titles under the Archbishopric of Trier.

Aware as he was of his declining health, he had already named his successor, his nephew John Hugo of Orsbeck, by 1672. He died on 1 June 1676 in Schloss Philippsburg below the Ehrenbreitstein fortress.

Charles Caspar von der Leyen House of Leyen Born: 18 December 1618 Died: 1 June 1676 on Ehrenbreitstein Fortress
Catholic Church titles
Regnal titles
Preceded by Philipp Christoph von Sötern	Archbishop- Elector of Trier and Prince-Abbot of Prüm as Charles II; 1652–1676	Succeeded by John VIII
