= Philipp Christoph von Sötern =

- Archbishop of Trier
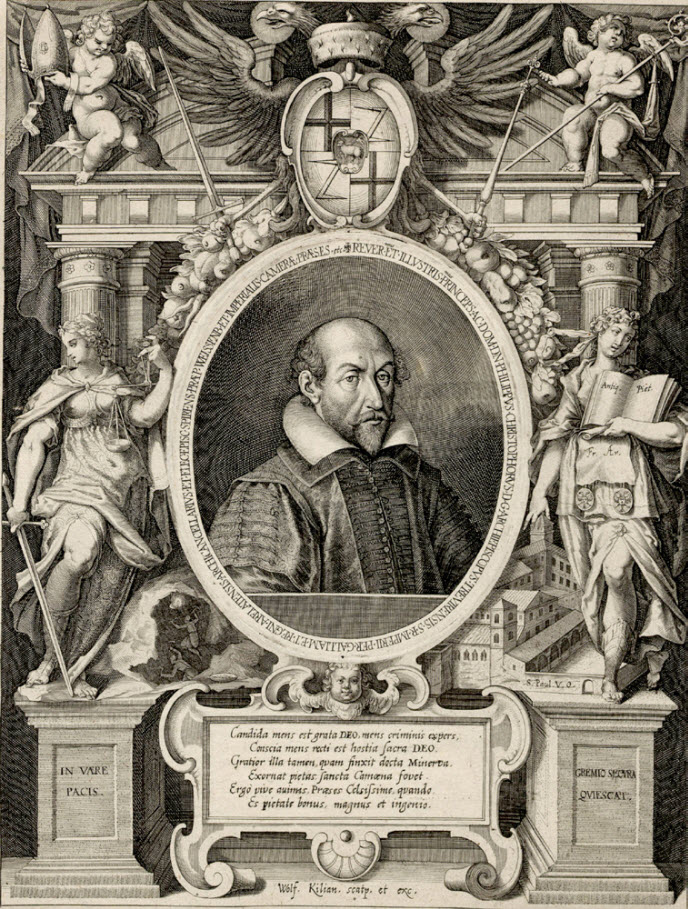
- Church: Catholic Church
- Diocese: Electorate of Trier
- In office: 1623–1652

Personal details
- Born: 11 December 1567 Zweibrücken, County Palatine of Zweibrücken
- Died: 7 February 1652 (aged 84) Trier, Electorate of Trier

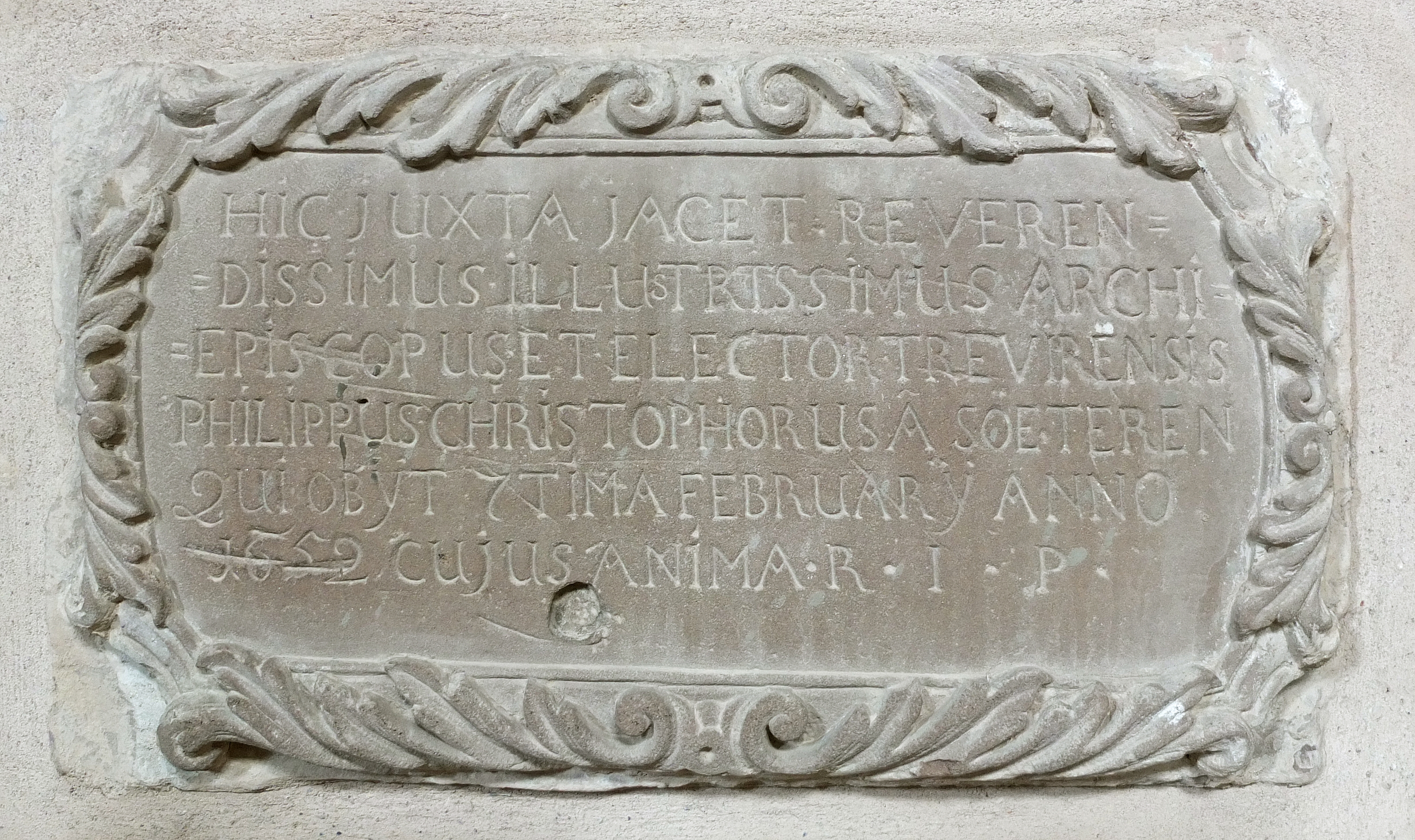
Epitaph in the Cathedral of Trier

Philipp Christoph von Sötern (11 December 1567 – 7 February 1652) was the Prince-Bishop of Speyer from 1610 to 1652 and the Archbishop-Elector of Trier from 1623 to 1652.

== Biography ==
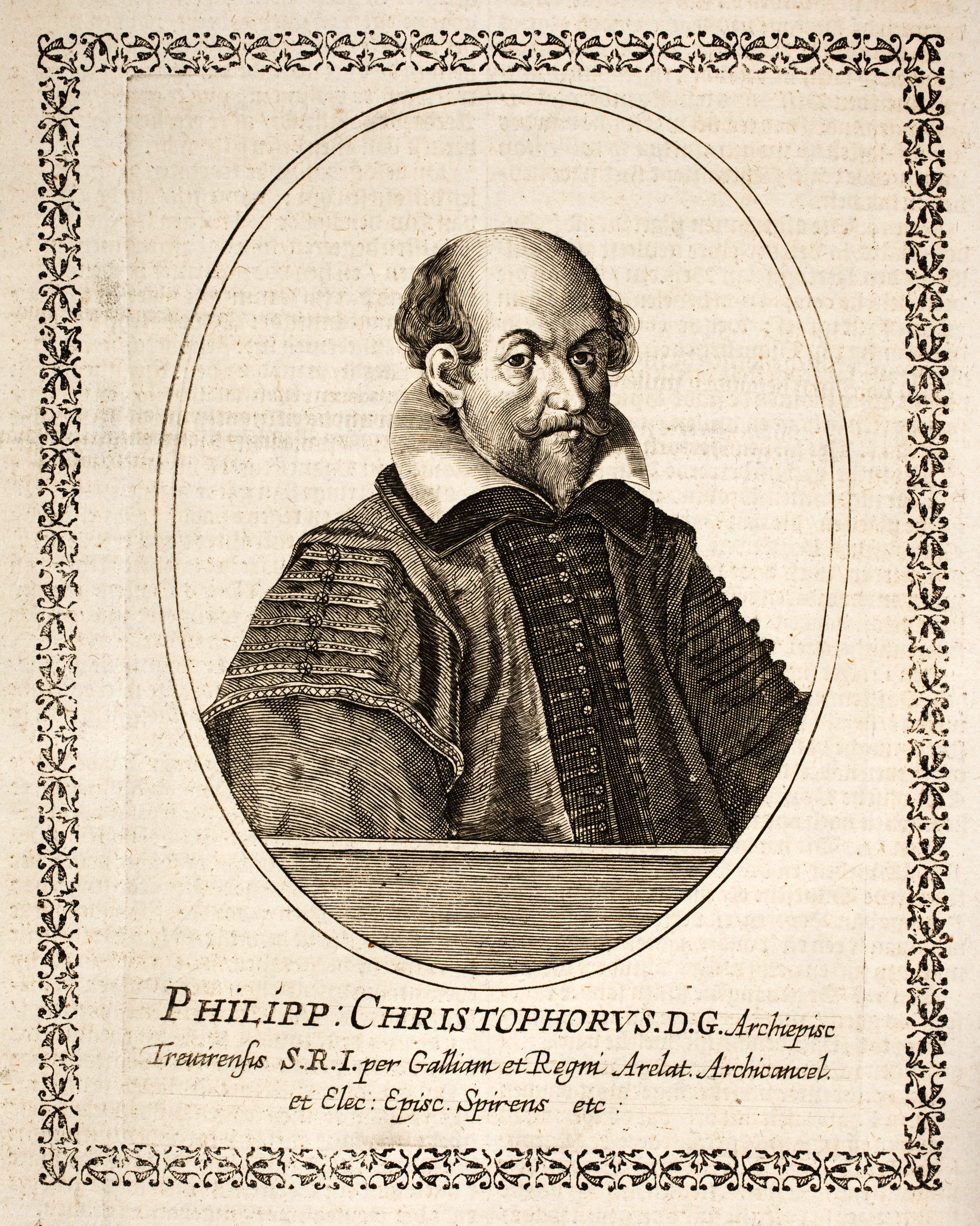
Philipp Christoph von Sötern

Philipp Christoph von Sötern was born in Zweibrücken. He was the son of a Catholic mother and a Protestant father, and was initially baptized as a Lutheran. He converted to Catholicism as a child. As an adolescent, he was educated at the Jesuit school in Trier.

At age 17, he became a canon of the Cathedral of Trier; he later also acquired canonicates at Mainz Cathedral and Speyer Cathedral. He was elected provost of Trier in 1604 and proved adept at handling legal and diplomatic disputes.

On 30 May 1609, the cathedral chapter of Speyer Cathedral elected Sötern coadjutor bishop of Speyer, alongside Bishop Eberhard von Dienheim. Pope Paul V confirmed his appointment on 11 December 1609. Upon the death of Dienheim, Sötern succeeded as Bishop of Speyer on 10 October 1610. He was subsequently ordained as a priest on 8 August 1612. He was consecrated as a bishop by Stephan Weber, Auxiliary Bishop of Mainz, on 15 August 1612. In 1615, he ordered the fortification of the city of Udenheim, finalized by 1623 as Philippsburg fortress.

Between 1626 and 1632, he constructed the Philippsburg palace below the Ehrenbreitstein Fortress in Koblenz.

During the Thirty Years' War, he started as supporter of the Catholic League but his growing tense with the Spanish Habsburgs led him on the side of France and in opposition to Emperor Ferdinand II. The cathedral chapter of the Cathedral of Trier elected Sötern Archbishop of Trier on 25 September 1623 and Pope Urban VIII confirmed this appointment on 11 March 1624. As archbishop, Sötern pursued a rigid fiscal policy that made him unpopular with the people of the Archbishopric of Trier. He also alienated the people by appointing his family members to high office. In 1630, the people of Trier asked the spanish government in Luxemburg for help which responded by sending troops to occupy Trier. With aide from French troops, Sötern retook the city in 1632. In exchange and to protect his Bishoprics from Swedish troops, Sötern allowed France to occupy the fortress of Ehrenbreitstein. In 1634, Sötern supported the election of Cardinal Richelieu as coadjutor Archbishop of Trier, which would have given Richelieu control of a vote in an imperial election if Sötern had predeceased Richelieu.

Spanish Habsburg troops under Christopher of East Frisia retook Trier by surprise in 1635, and Sötern was subsequently imprisoned in Linz from 1635 to 1645. France used his imprisonment as pretext to declare war on Spain, starting the Franco-Spanish War. During his absence, the cathedral chapter took over administration of the archbishopric. Imperial troops dispelled the French garrison of Ehrenbreitstein in 1637 and occupied the place until the end of the war. The French diplomats in Westphalia demanded the archbishop's release, to which Emperor Ferdinand III agreed in 1645 for Sötern acceding to the Peace of Prague and delivering Philippsburg to the Emperor. After his release, Sötern again entered into secret negotiations with France. He ordered Turenne to capture the still Spanish occupied Trier and left Philippsburg to French troops against his agreement with the Emperor.

After French troops took Trier in November 1645 and once more left a garrison, most of the cathedral chapter feared for their safety and fled to Cologne. Sötern appointed new capitulars in their place. In 1649, Sötern made the newly appointed capitular Philipp Ludwig von Reiffenberg to his coadjutor. The exiled cathedral chapter protested and organised troops to take control of the Electorate and force Sötern to accept an election of the coadjutor. The troops headed by the capitular Karl Kaspar von der Leyen succeeded against the Elector's French auxiliary troops and the election determined Von der Leyen as coadjutor and designated successor of Sötern. The reluctant Elector finally gave up resistance and died mostly disempowered in Trier on 7 February 1652.

Catholic Church titles
Preceded by Lothar von Metternich	Archbishop of Trier; 1623-1652	Succeeded by Karl Kaspar von der Leyen
