= Johann Hugo von Orsbeck =

Archbishop-Elector of Trier from 1675 to 1711

- Archbishop of Trier
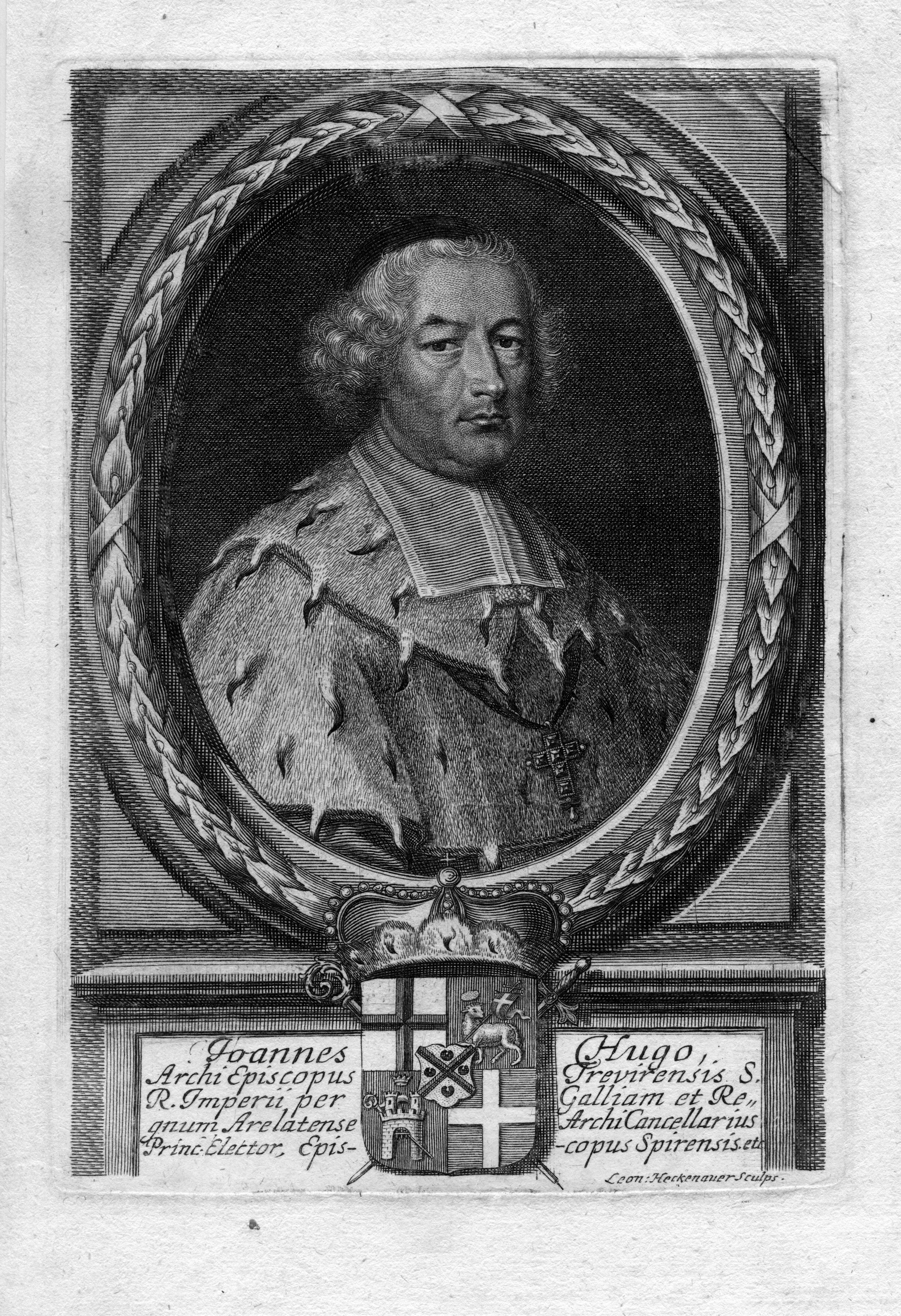
- Church: Catholic Church
- Diocese: Electorate of Trier
- In office: 1675–1711

Orders
- Ordination: 24 March 1674
- Consecration: 7 November 1677 by Johann Heinrich von Anethan

Personal details
- Born: 30 January 1634
- Died: 6 January 1711 (aged 76)

Johann Hugo von Orsbeck (1634–1711) was the Archbishop-Elector of Trier from 1675 to 1711.

== Early life ==
Johann Hugo von Orsbeck was born in Weilerswist on January 30, 1634, the son of Wilhelm von Orsbeck, Herr von Vernich († 1648) and of Katharina von der Leyen († 1673). His mother was the sister of Karl Kaspar von der Leyen-Hohengeroldseck, Archbishop of Trier, and of Damian Hartard von der Leyen-Hohengeroldseck, Archbishop of Mainz. Johann Hugo von Orsbeck and his brother Damian Emmerich von Orsbeck (1632-1682) studied at Cologne, beginning in 1642, and then in 1648, was sent to the Jesuit school in Mainz. Johann Hugo von Orsbeck received the tonsure in 1650. In 1652, the brothers were sent to the Collegium Germanicum in Rome.

Thereafter, von Orsbeck finished his theological studies in 1655 and embarked on a two-month trip to Italy. In the meantime he was taken into the cathedral chapter of the Cathedral of Trier (1651) and Speyer Cathedral (1653). He spent 1655-57 studying at the University of Paris and at Pont-à-Mousson. He received the minor orders in 1658 and became a canon of the Cathedral of Trier and Speyer Cathedral. He was elected dean of Speyer Cathedral in 1660.

== Archbishop ==
On January 7, 1672, the cathedral chapter of the Cathedral of Trier elected von Orsbeck coadjutor Archbishop of Trier (alongside his uncle Karl Kaspar von der Leyen-Hohengeroldseck).

This appointment was confirmed by Pope Clement X on December 12, 1672, and he was appointed Titular Archbishop of Larissa. He was ordained as a priest on March 24, 1674. The cathedral chapter of Speyer Cathedral elected Orsbeck Bishop of Speyer on July 16, 1675.

He succeeded his uncle as Archbishop of Trier upon the death of his uncle on June 1, 1676.

He was formally installed as Archbishop on July 23, 1676. Pope Innocent XI confirmed his appointment as Bishop of Speyer on May 10, 1677. Johann Heinrich von Anethan, Auxiliary Bishop of Cologne, consecrated Orsbeck as a bishop on November 7, 1677.

As Archbishop, von Orsbeck earned a reputation as a reformer.

During the War of the Reunions, the Archbishopric of Trier was occupied by troops of the Kingdom of France in June and July 1684.

The French again invaded the archbishopric and the Bishopric of Speyer with the outbreak of the Nine Years' War in 1688. During the course of this occupation, the towns of Cochem, Mayen, and Wittlich were burned.

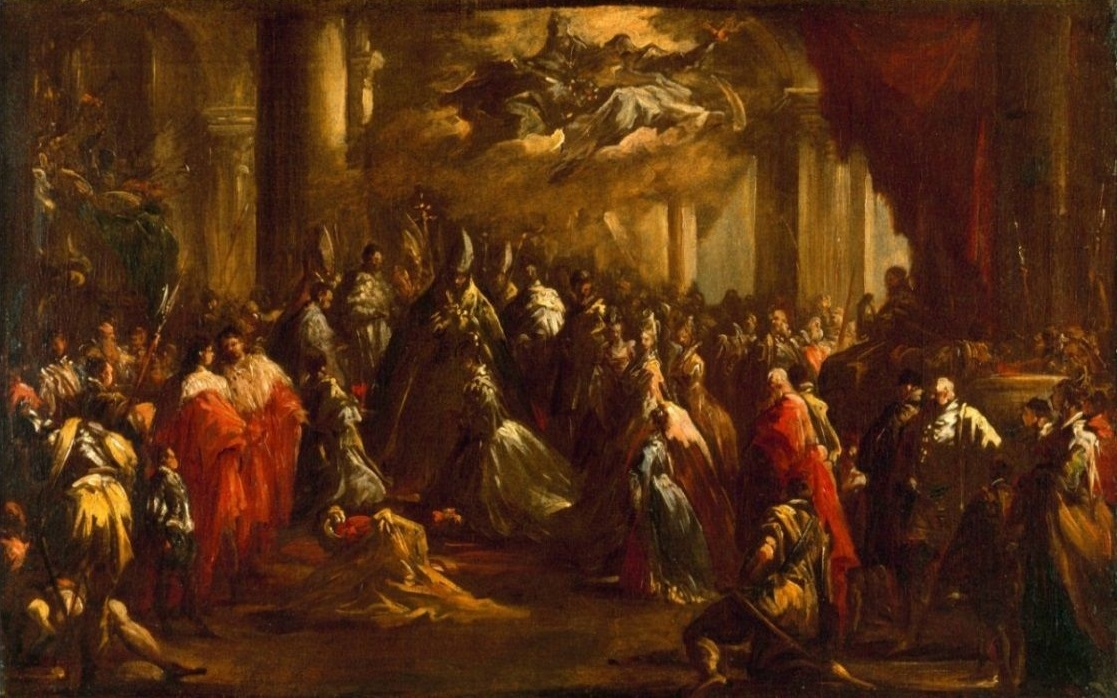
Coronation of Eleonore Magdalene as a Holy Roman Empress, painted by Giovanni Antonio Pellegrini, ca. 1713-15. Standing behind and to the left of the consecrating bishop is von Orsebeck.

He attended the coronation of Empress Eleonore Magdalene of Neuburg on January 19, 1690.

On January 24, 1690, Orsbeck participated in the formal imperial election that elected the future Joseph I, Holy Roman Emperor as King of the Romans.

Soon after the outbreak of the War of the Spanish Succession, Orsbeck on May 8, 1702 entered into a defensive alliance with the Kingdom of England and the Dutch Republic against the Kingdom of France. In October 1702, French troops under Camille d'Hostun, duc de Tallard occupied the Archbishopric of Trier, staying there until after the English victory at the Battle of Blenheim (August 13, 1704) and leaving in October 1704.

On September 24, 1710, Orsbeck oversaw the election of Charles Joseph of Lorraine as his coadjutor and chosen successor.

Orsbeck died in Trier on January 6, 1711. He had served from 1676 to 1711 as an Elector.

Catholic Church titles
| Preceded by Lothar Friedrich von Metternich-Burscheid | Bishop of Speyer; 1675-1711 | Succeeded by Damian Hartard von der Leyen |
| Preceded by Karl Kaspar von der Leyen-Hohengeroldseck | Archbishop of Trier; 1676-1711 | Succeeded by Charles Joseph of Lorraine |
