= Schloss Kärlich =

Hunting lodge in Rhineland-Palatinate, Germany

Kärlich palace
- Jagdschloss Kärlich (German); Kurfürstliches Schloss zu Kärlich (German)
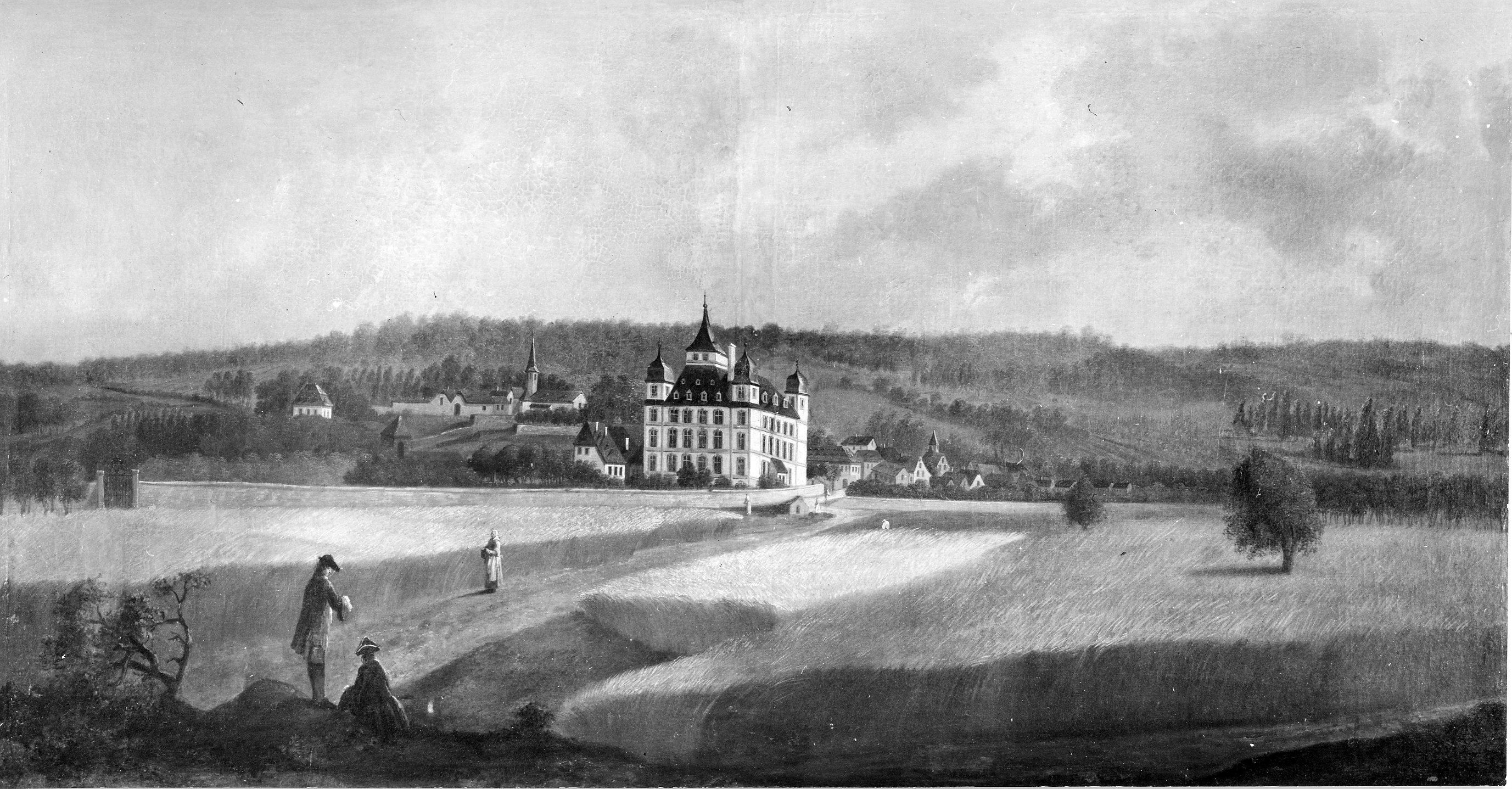
- Schloss Kärlich on a painting by Gottfried Bernhard Manskich in Bürresheim Castle (around 1760)
- Location: Koblenz

History
- Built: c. 1344
- Built for: Karl Kaspar von der Leyen
- Rebuilt: 1480; Between 1654 and 1660

Site notes
- Architectural style: Renaissance style

The Kärlich palace (German: Jagdschloss Kärlich or German: Kurfürstliches Schloss zu Kärlich) is a former electoral hunting lodge in Kärlich near Koblenz, Germany. It was situated on the northern side of the village. It served as a summer retreat and hunting lodge for the Prince-Electors and Archbishops of Trier.

On the site of a destroyed medieval castle, Prince-Elector Karl Kaspar von der Leyen (1618–1676) constructed a renaissance style moated castle between 1654 and 1660. At the end of the 18th century, Prince-Elector Clemens Wenceslaus of Saxony (1739–1812) created a large English landscape garden at Kärlich including various neoclassical buildings.

During the French Revolutionary Wars, the Prince-Elector had to flee his electorate. Thereafter, French revolutionary troops looted and demolished the hunting lodge.

There is not much left of the castle today, except for various columns and a model of the castle, which can be admired in the local museum of the Mülheim-Kärlich municipality. Also, nothing remembers anymore of the English landscape, which was one of the first in Germany.

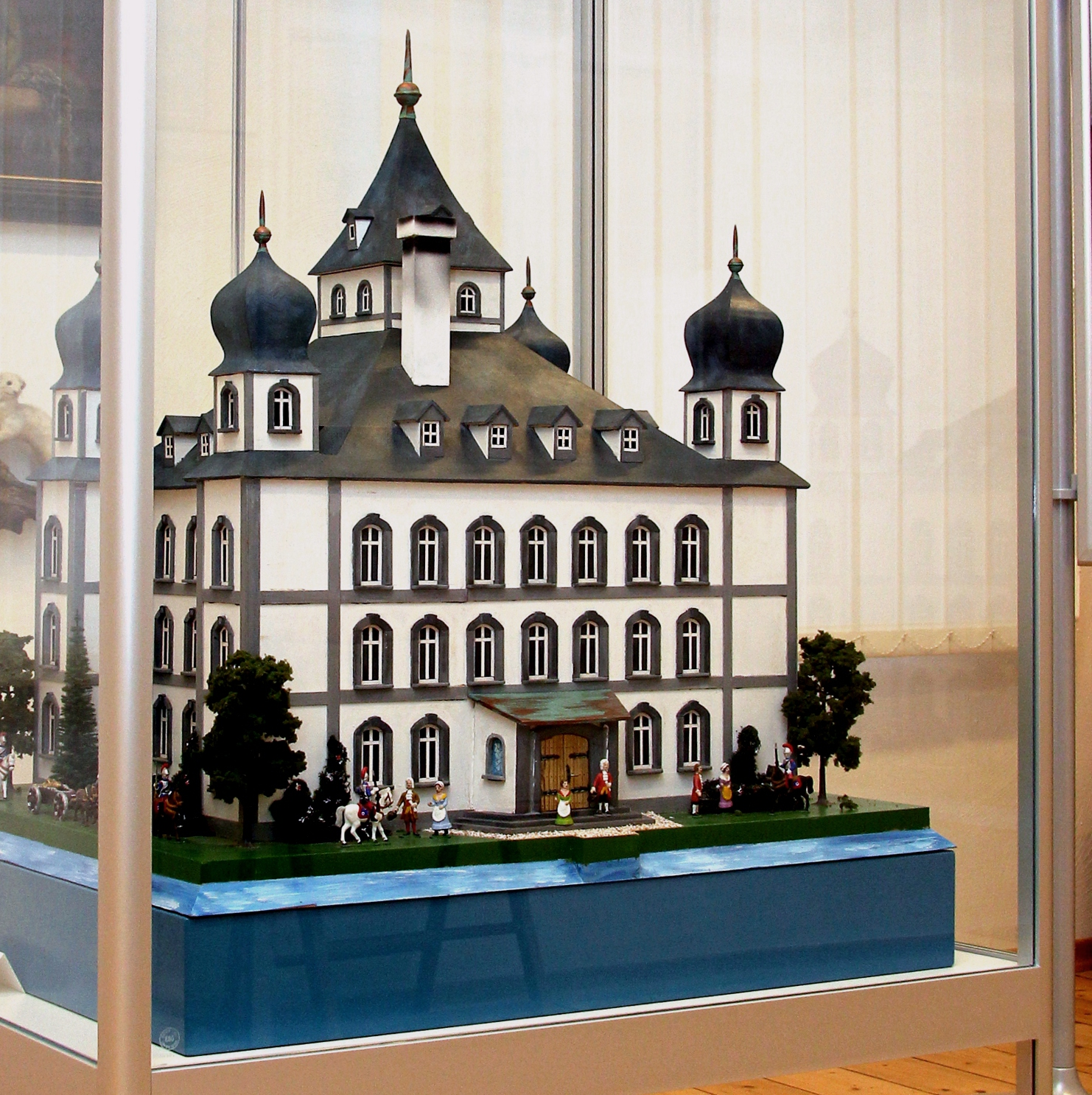
A model of the Kärlich palace in the local city museum

== History ==
=== Middle Ages ===
The Kärlich hunting lodge traces its origins back to a manor from the 14th century, presumably built around 1344 under Prince-Elector Baldwin of Luxembourg (1285–1354). According to archaeological findings, it stood at the crossing of the current Burg- und Klosterstraße in Kärlich.

In 1480, Prince-Elector John II of Baden (1434–1503) built a new manor and hunting lodge in Kärlich. Its exact location and appearance are not described in known sources. It is only mentioned that it stood by a pond ("nechst bay dem wayer"). During the Thirty Years' War, in the summer of 1635, the manor and hunting lodge, as well as large parts of Kärlich, were destroyed.

=== Karl Kasper von der Leyen ===
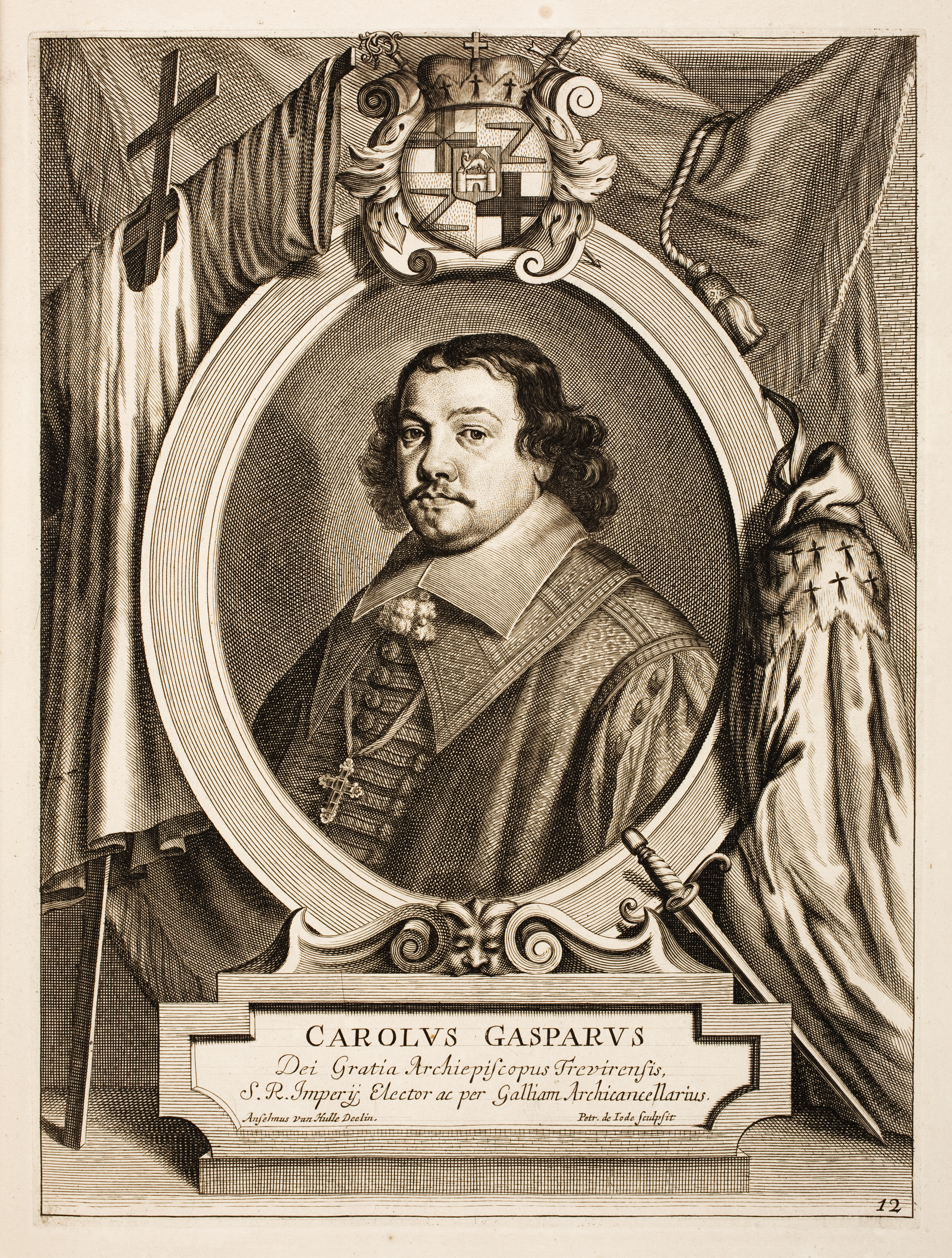
Karl Kasper von der Leyen

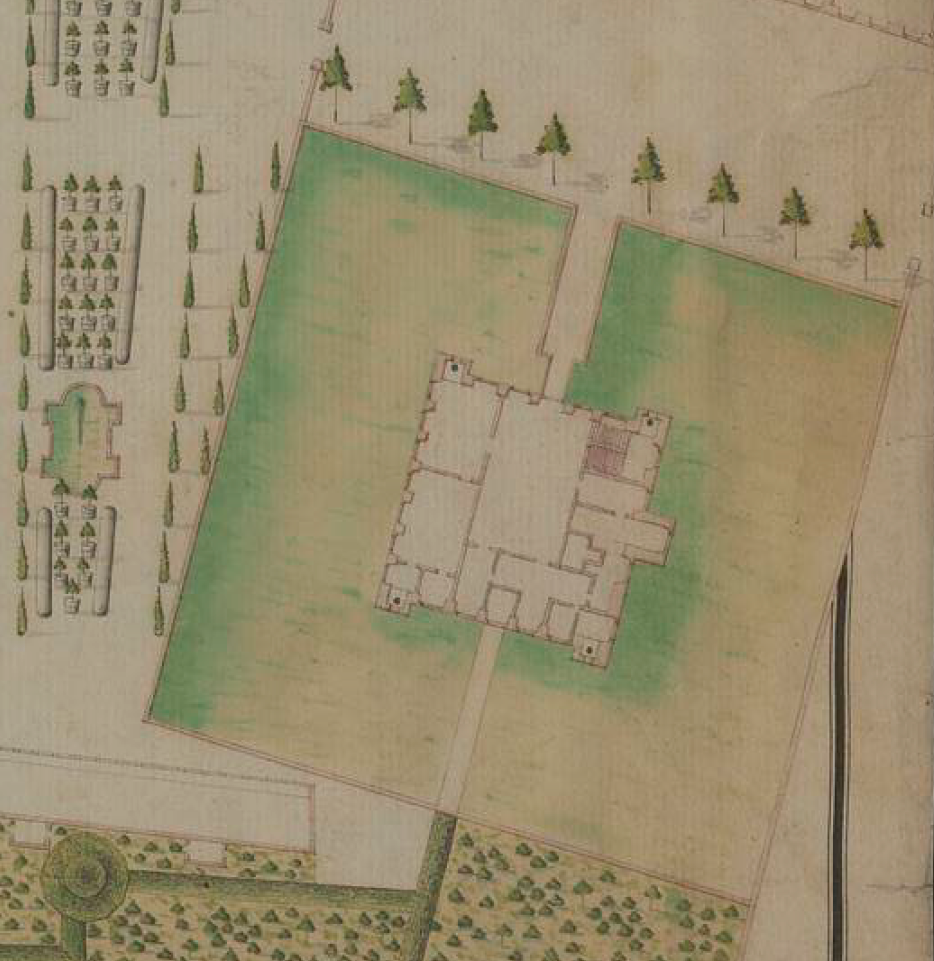
Floorplan of Schloss Kärlich (1771)

On the location of the old castle in Kärlich, Prince-Elector Karl Kaspar von der Leyen (1618–1676) built a new representative palace between 1654 and 1660. It was a moated castle constructed in renaissance style. The design was by the Franciscan brother Gerhard Mahler. An avid architecture enthusiast, Karl Kaspar also undertook a significant reconstruction of his family castle in Blieskastel.

Karl Kasper and his successors used the moated castle as a hunting lodge and a retreat for relaxation and festivities. Although, it was sometimes also used for other (political and representative) purposes. In the summers of 1654 and 1658, preliminary discussions on the Imperial election took place at the Kärlich palace with the Prince-Electors of Mainz and Cologne.

Prince-Elector Johann IX Philipp von Walderdorff (1701–1768) was an avid hunter and loved coming to Kärlich, which became one of his main retreats. A stone cross erected in the grounds "Am Hoorweiher" commemorates this time. In 1756, the Elector had invited people for a hunt. The first chase took place in the area of Schloss Engers . Then the Elector returned to Kärlich. For a change, the chief forester organized a hare hunt. The pack of hounds and the hunters soon tracked down a hare. When one of the hunters, Mr. von Knoering, in a wild ride, tried to cut off the animal's path, he struck his head on the branch of a tree, mutilating his face beyond recognition, and he fell unconscious to the ground. He died after six days. The memorial cross was originally erected at the site of the accident.

=== Clemens Wenzeslaus of Saxony ===
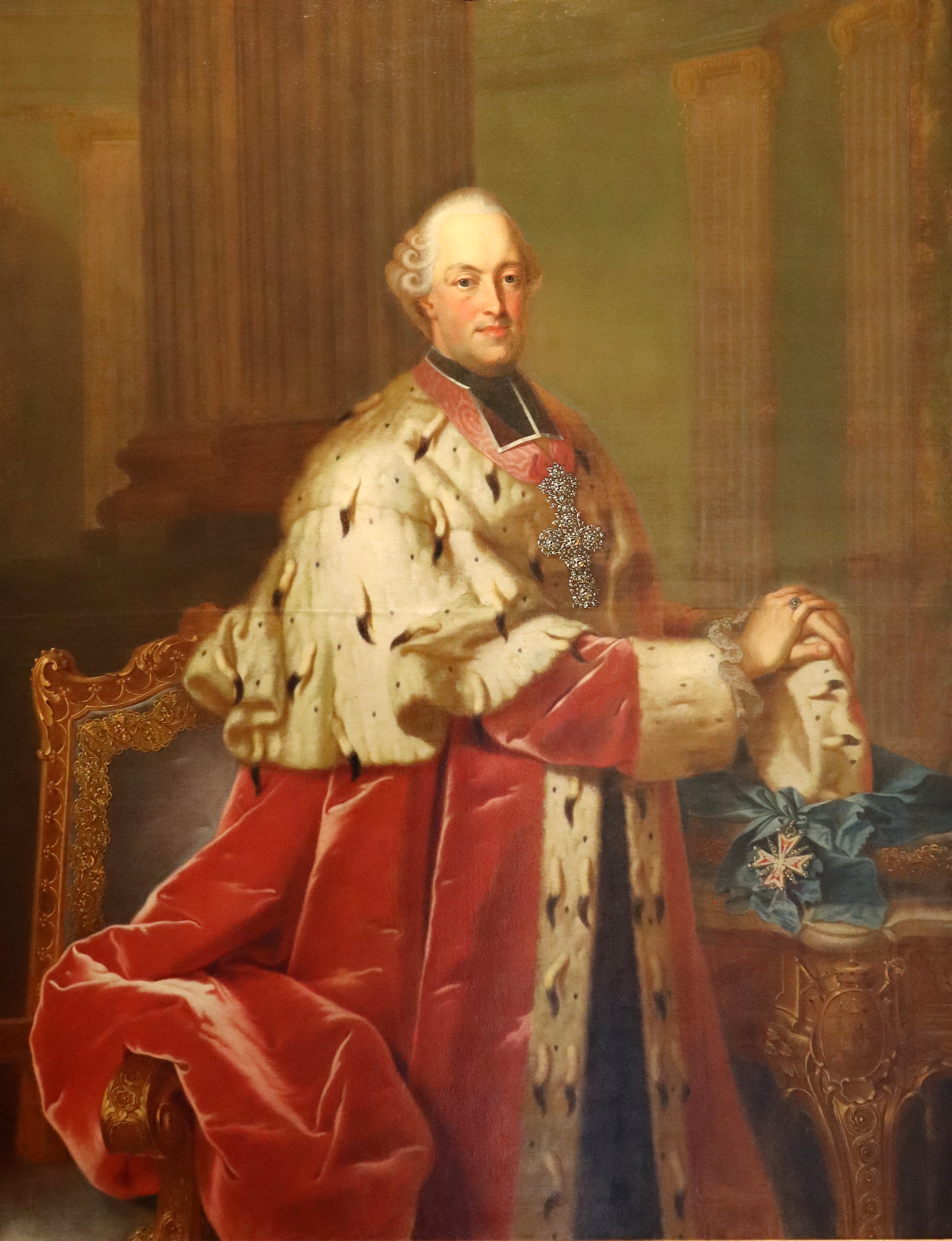
Clemens Wenzeslaus of Saxony

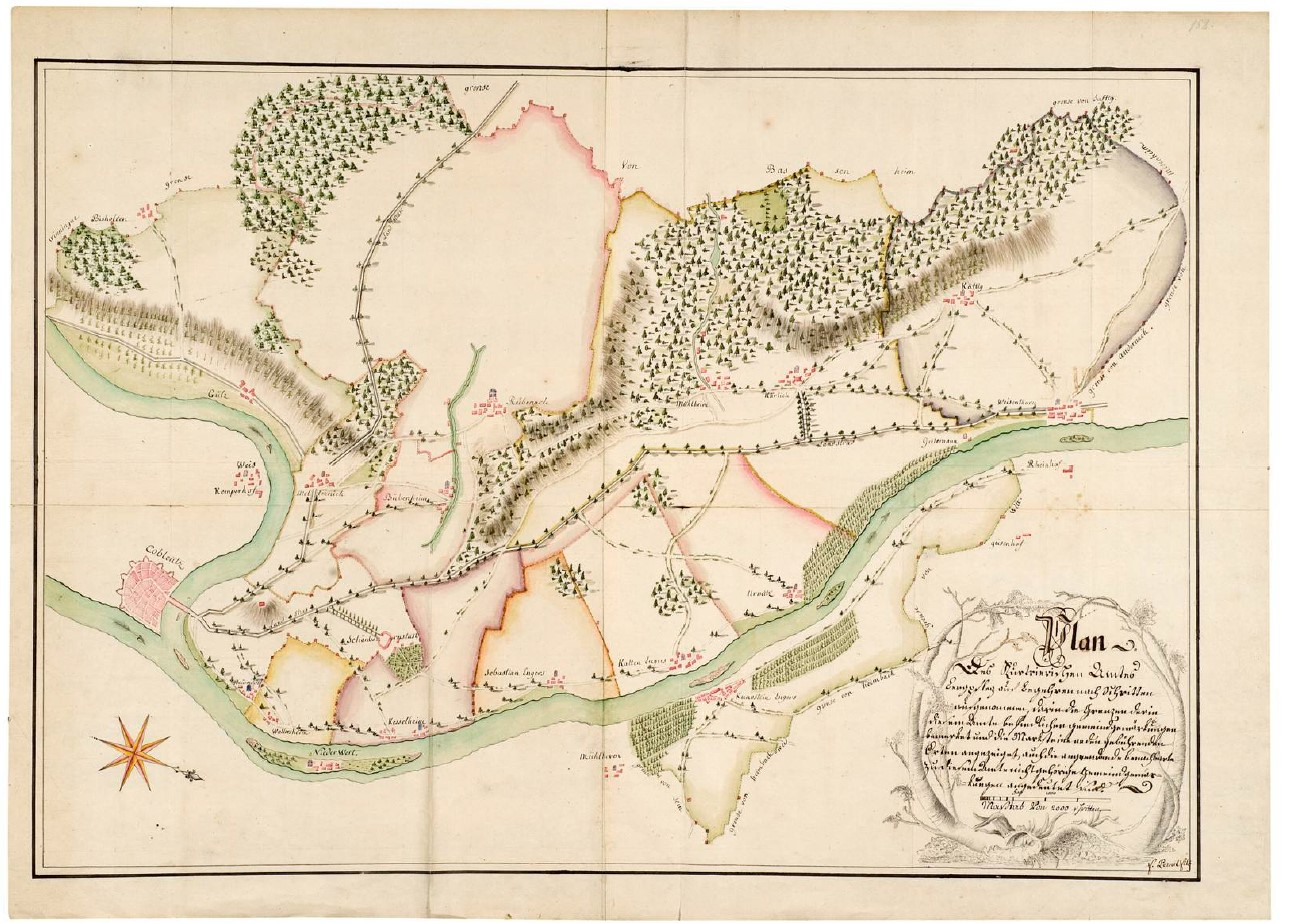
Map of Koblenz and its northern surroundings (2nd half 18th century) showing the residential landscape north of Koblenz with the locations of the palaces Schönbornslust, Kärlich and Engers

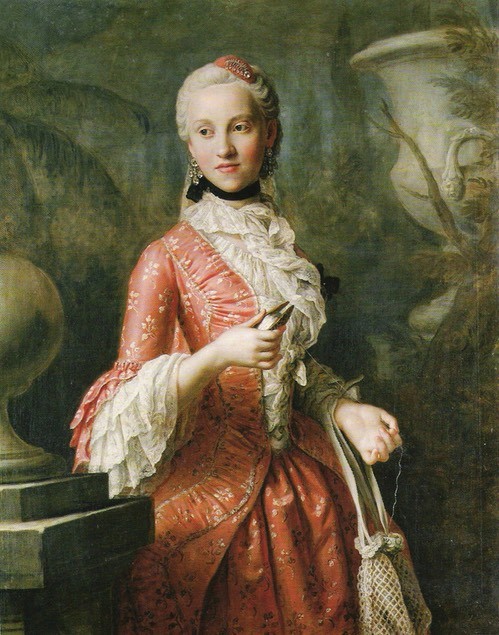
Maria Kunigunde of Saxony by Pietro Rotari

Prince-Elector Clemens Wenceslaus of Saxony (1739–1812) was very fond of Kärlich. It became one of his preferred retreats, next to Schönbornslust. Of all electors, he most frequently visited the castle. Although, he was not a fan of the hunt itself. Often, he was accompanied by his sister, Maria Kunigunde of Saxony (1740–1826), the Princess-Abbess of Essen and Thorn. She was very influential figure at the electoral court, as the Prince-Elector almost took no decision without consulting her.

Various plans were drawn to construct a new palace at Kärlich. In 1768, Jean Vilmart made a proposal. Another proposal by the architect Johanness Seiz dates from 1771. However, both designs were not realized. As the electoral treasury was not sufficient. And at the same time, a new Electoral palace was constructed as well in Koblenz. But what the Prince-Elector did do, was extending the palace gardens with a new English landscape garden, one of the earliest examples in Germany.

When the Prince-Elector came to Kärlich, he would often come by barge from the palace in Koblenz. He frequently travelled with a large entourage. When he visited Kärlich in 1776, he was accompanied by 173 people.

In the castle chapel on 10 August 1784, Clemens Wenzeslaus ordained the theology student Franz Josef Pey as a priest. Pey died as a martyr during the September Massacres in Paris on 3 September 3 1792.

=== French revolutionary wars ===
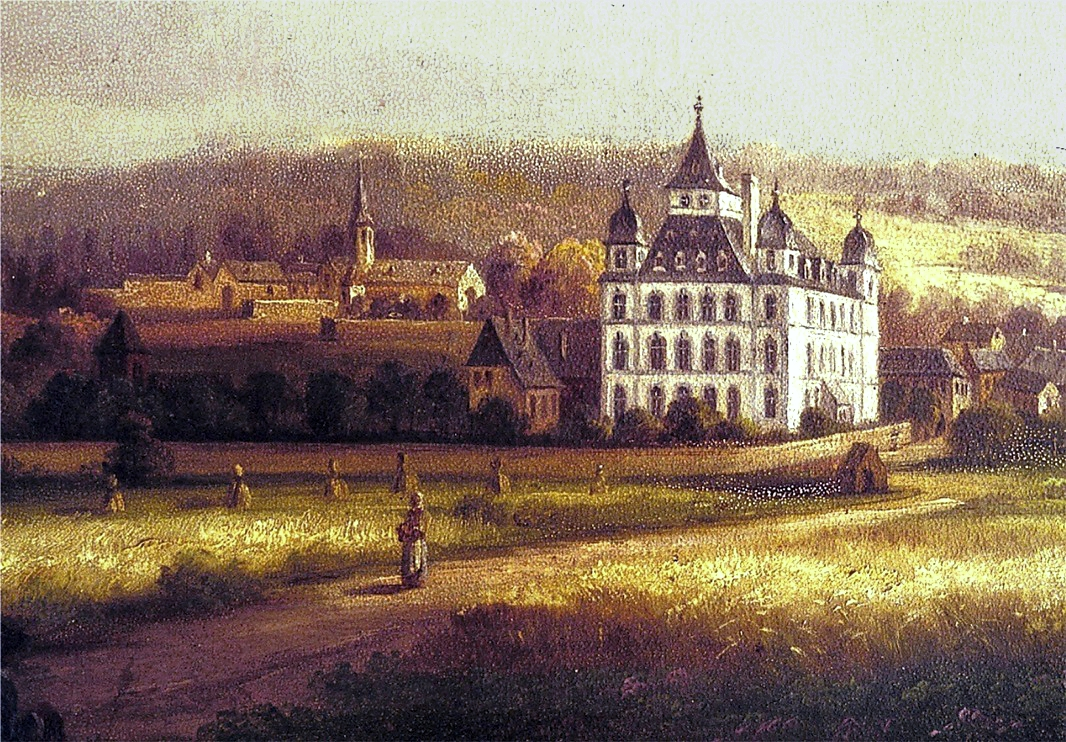
Detail of the Manskich painting

During the French revolutionary wars, the Prince-Elector had to leave his electorate, together with his sister. First, they fled from Kärlich to Bonn on 21 October 1792, ahead of the advancing French revolutionary troops. They returned once more, and had to flee again on 5 October 1794, to Augsburg.

The French troops under General François Séverin Marceau destroyed the hunting lodge and its surrounding park on 22 and 23 October 1794. The palace ruins served the citizens of Kärlich and Mülheim as a source of building materials. Depending on the source, the French state auctioned the lands to four locals between 1804 or 1806 and 1810.

== Architecture ==
The hunting lodge stood a few meters south of today's Kärlich elementary school. It was a rectangular structure with side lengths of approximately 23 and 19 meters. In the center rose a pointed central tower, and at the corners, small turrets with domed roofs were constructed. Windows with flat-arched lintels reflected the renaissance style. The building had three stories with halls and rooms, as well as a small chapel on the third floor. The staircase was in the southwest corner.

In 1778, Clemens Wenzeslaus had the moat surrounding the castle, approximately 20 meters wide, filled due to the "unhealthiness" it caused.

In addition, to the castle there were various ancillary buildings, such as the stables.

== Palace garden ==
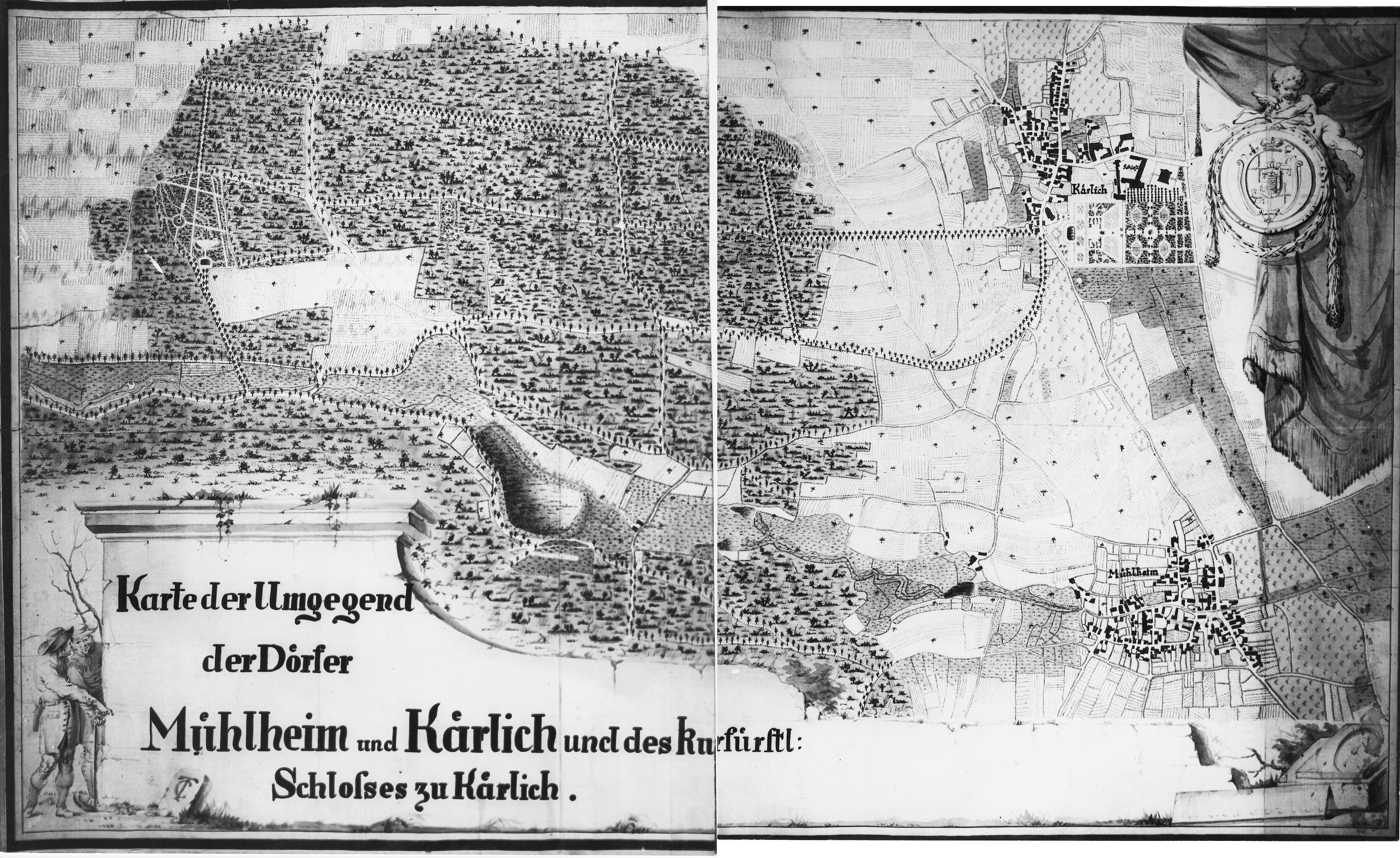
Plan of the Kärlich hunting lodge and its park. The English landscape garden is on the left

=== The French formal garden ===
Karl Kasper von der Leyen had the first garden created in the mid of the 17th century. It was about 20 hectares in size. It extended from Burgstraße eastward to Poststraße in today's district of Mülheim and southward to Kärlicher and Mülheimer Straße.

It was a French formal garden inspired by the gardens of the Palace of Versailles. The garden featured hedges, mazes, pavilions, fountains and grottoes. The necessary water came from the Mülheimer Bach.

During the reign of Prince-Elector Francis Louis of Palatinate-Neuburg (1664–1732), an orangery was added in 1722. In 1727, it contained around 540 different plants, including 87 lemon trees.

=== The English landscape garden ===
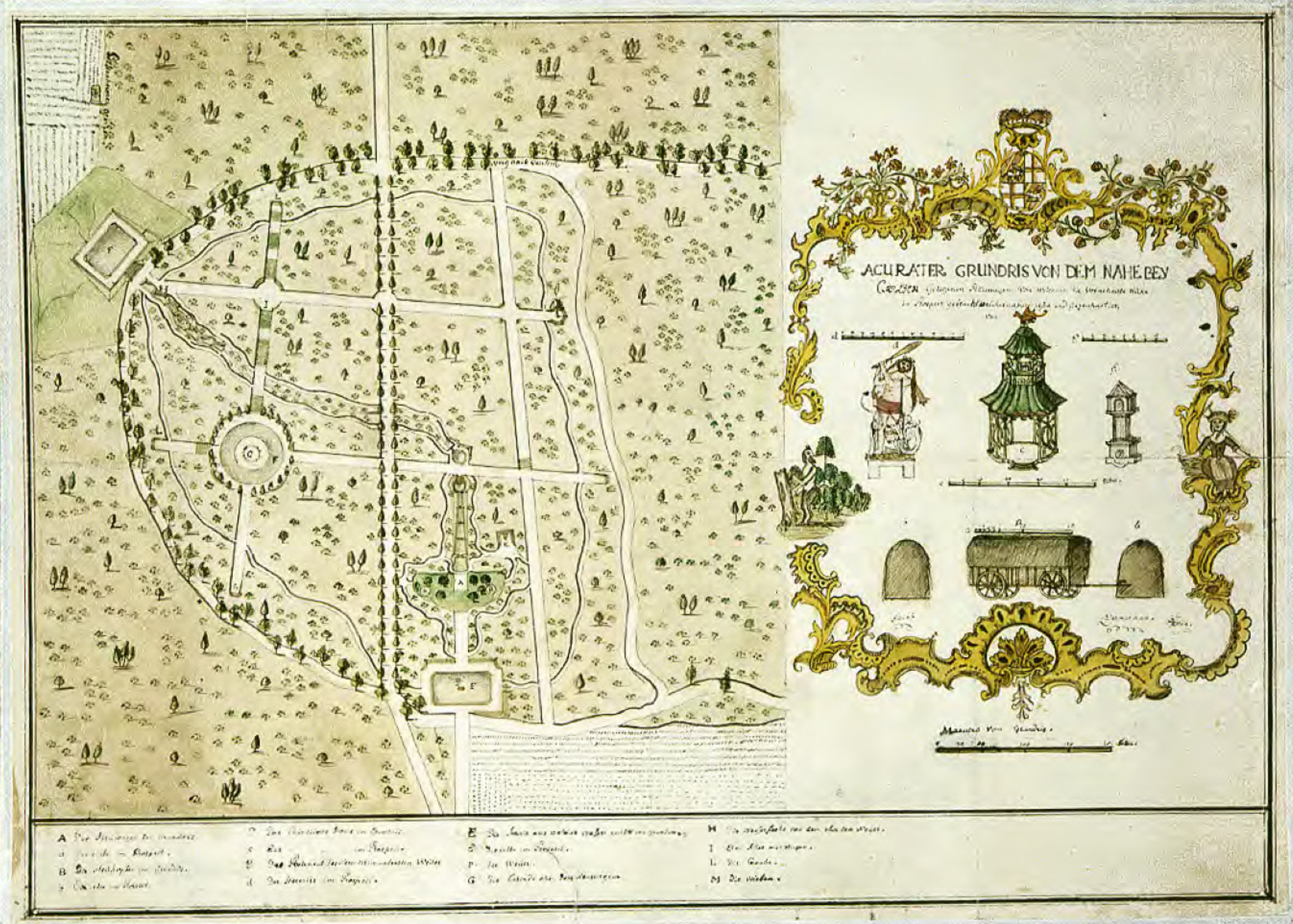
Plan of the English landscape garden at Kärlich

Clemens Wenceslaus of Saxony was not able to create a new summer retreat at Kärlich. But he expanded the park significantly by creating an English landscape garden. Joseph Heinrich Freiherr von Thünnefeld did the design of the garden, which was approximately 35 hectares in size. It was one of the first in Germany, like Schönbusch near Aschaffenburg and Wörlitz near Dessau.

Gradually, various buildings were added to the park, such as a small temple (tempietto) was created based on plans by Johann Andreas Gärtner (around 1788), and a neoclassical temple (or pantheon) by François Ignace Mangin (around 1790).

Farmers from Kärlich and Mülheim were employed to maintain the garden and park areas.

== Today ==
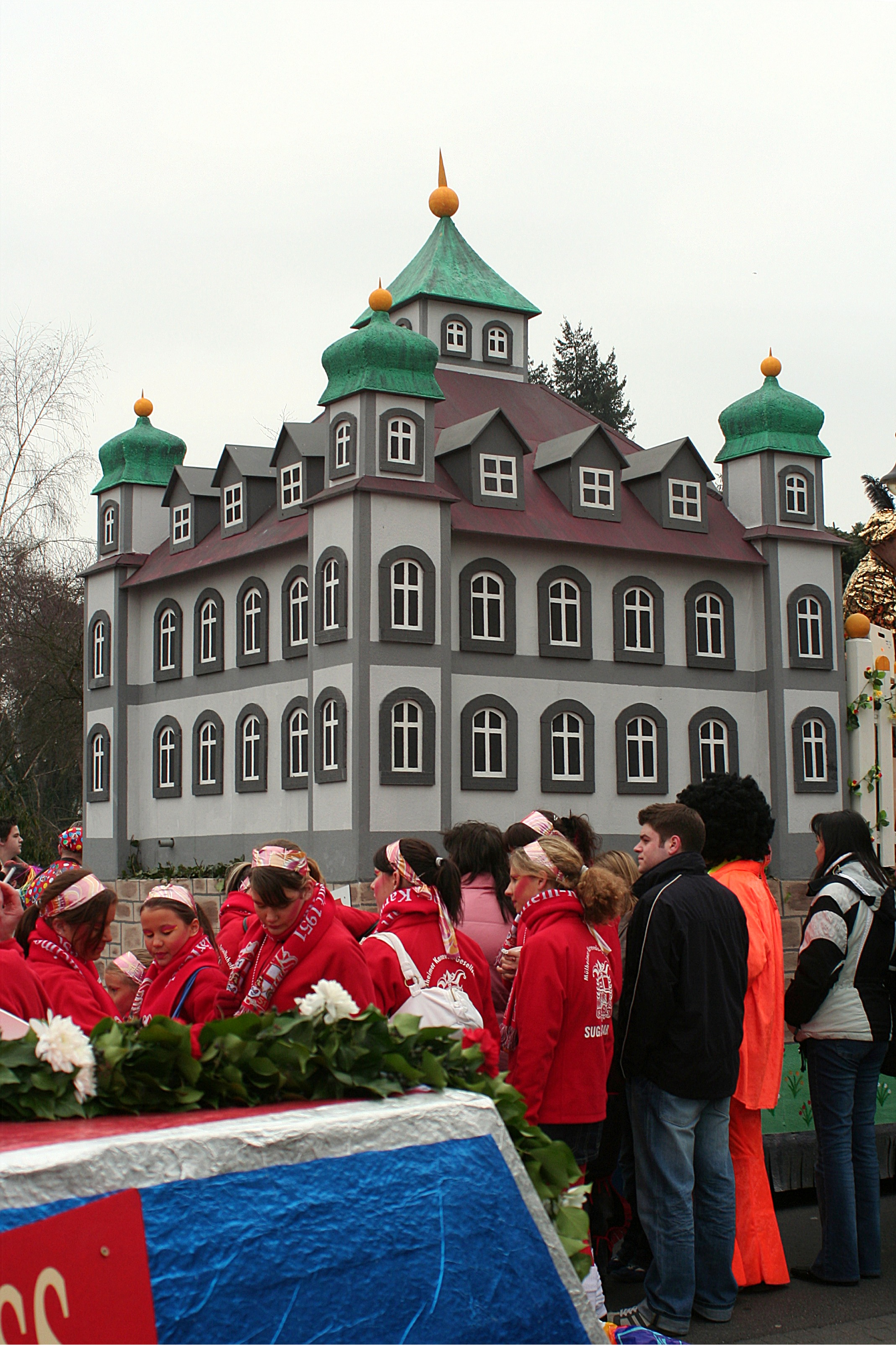
The Kärlich locals have not forgotten their palace. In 2007, they carried a model during their Carnival train

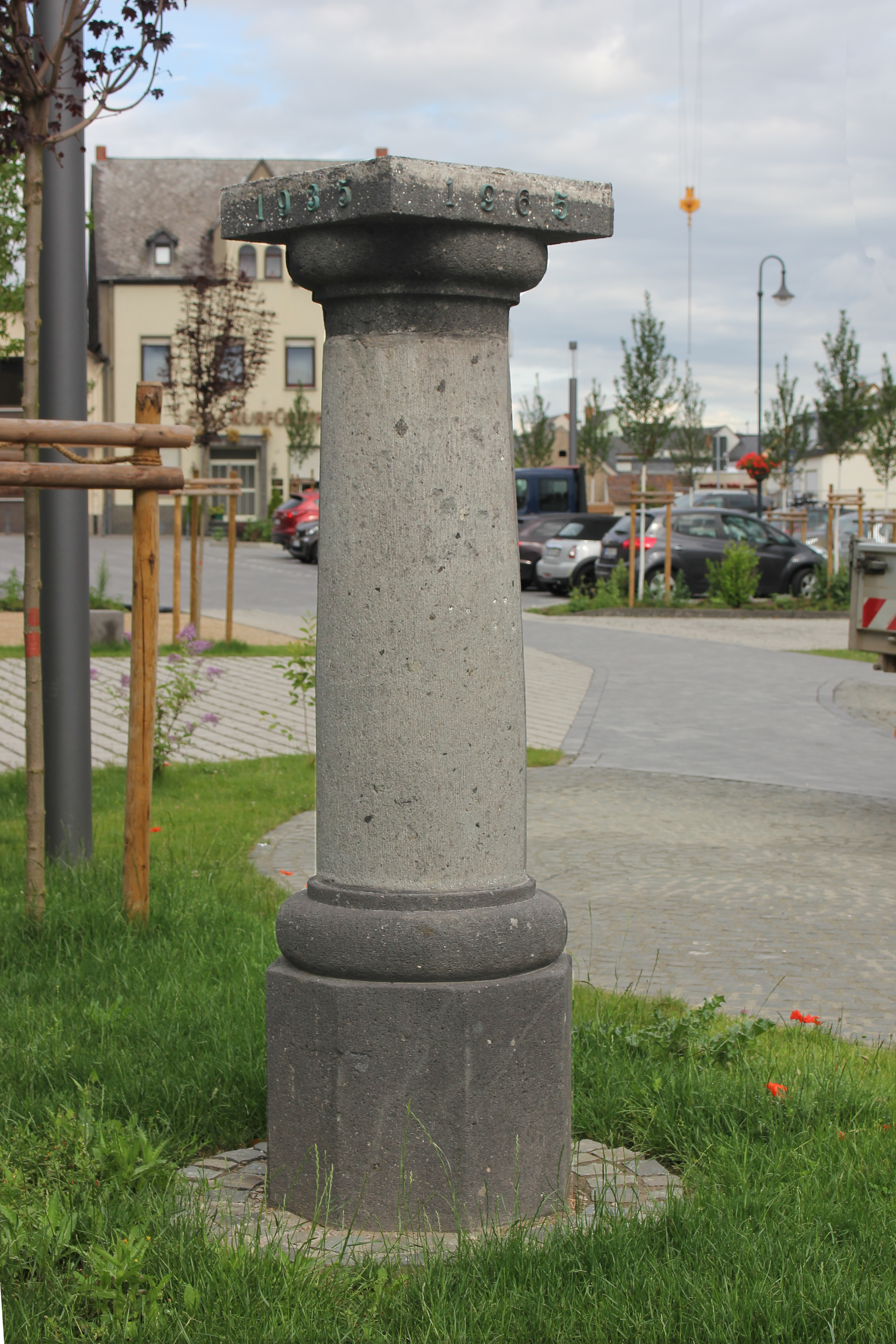
On its former location, one of the original columns remembers of Schloss Kärlich

Nothing has remained of the palace, except for some columns. Based on remaining plans, paintings and gravures, the local museum has made a model of the palace.

Also, there is nothing that remembers anymore of the gardens. The last trees remaining were felled in the 1970s, during road constructions.

=== Gallery: 18th century plans and designs ===
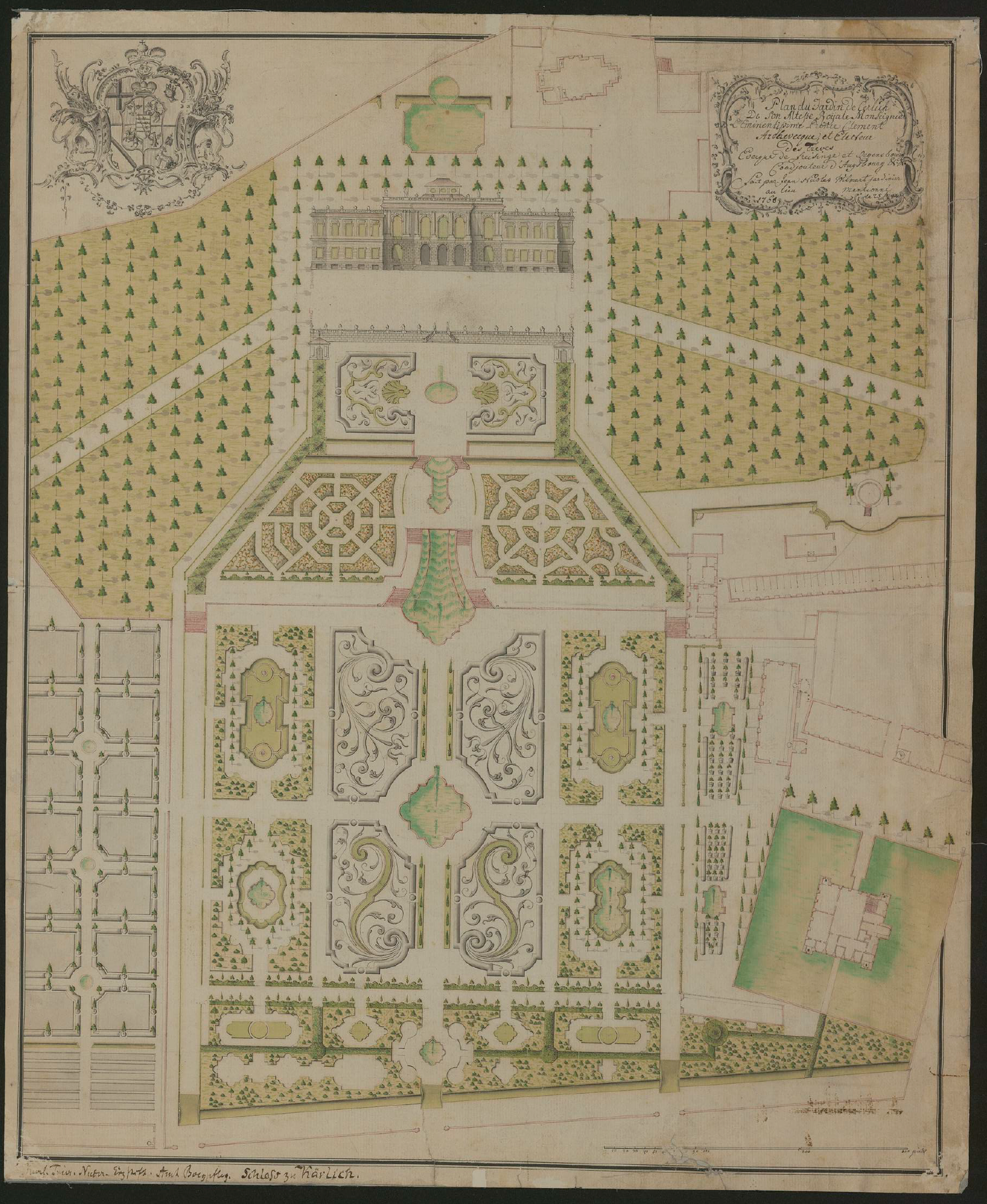
The 1768 proposal by Jean Vilmart for a new summer retreat on plan of the palace with its French formal garden

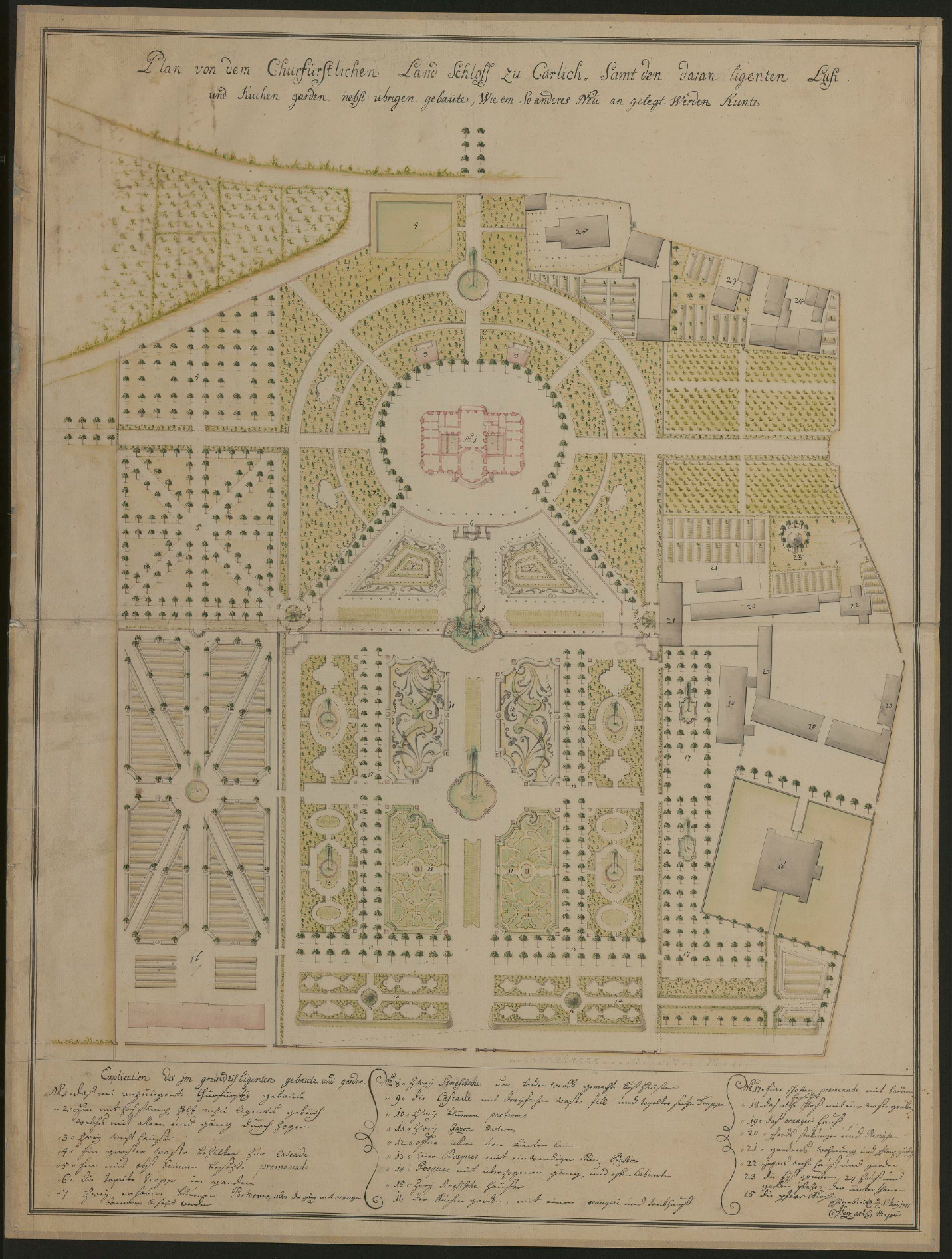
The 1771 proposal by Johannes Seiz, a student from Balthasar Neumann

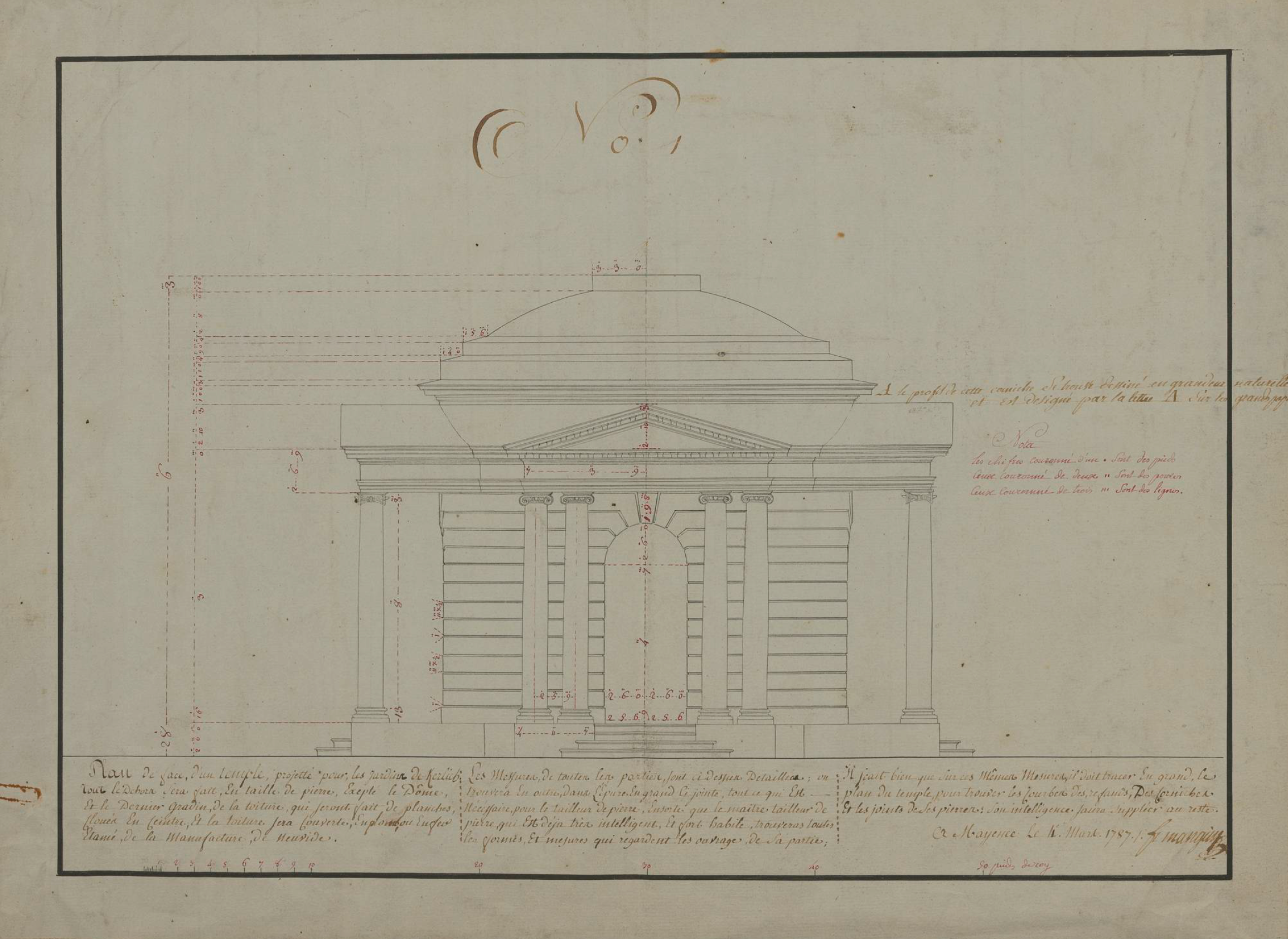
The 1787 design for the new temple (or Pantheon) in the English landscape garden

== See also ==
Other palaces, residences and hunting lodges of the Prince-Electors of Trier:

- Electoral Palace, Koblenz
- Electoral Palace, Trier
- The yellow castle of Montabaur
- Schloss Engers
- Schloss Philippsburg (Koblenz)
- Schloss Philippsfreude
- Schloss Schönbornslust

== Literature ==
- Henrichs, Winfried (1981). "Das ehemalige kurfürstliche Schloß in Kärlich und sein Garten". Mülheim-Kärlich (in German). Andernach: Winfried Henrichs. pp. 88–96.
- Kuhn, Hans-Wolfgang (1985). "Prüm, Wittlich, Schönbornlust und Kärlich. Vier frühe Veduten von Gottfried Bernhard Manskirsch (1736-1817)". Kurtrierisches Jahrbuch (in German). 25: 191–198.
- Vonhof-Habermayr, Margit (1996). "Kärlich - das Schloß". Das Schloß zu Blieskastel. Ein Werk der kapuzinischen Profanbaukunst im Dienste des Trierer Kurfürsten Karl Kaspar von der Leyen (1652–1676). (= Veröffentlichungen des Instituts für Landeskunde im Saarland, Bd. 37) (in German). Saarbrücken: Institut für Landeskunde im Saarland. pp. 167–169. ISBN 978-3-923877-37-9.
- Göller, Andreas (2002). "Der Kärlicher Schlosspark im 18. Jahrhundert. Ein Beitrag zur Gartenkunst in Kurtrier. In: Koblenzer Beiträge zur Geschichte und Kultur". Koblenzer Beiträge zur Geschichte und Kultur (in German). 9/10. Koblenz: Görres Verlag: 7–22.
- Henrichs, Winfried (2021). "Burgen und Schlösser in Kärlich". Heimatbuch 2021 (in German). Koblenz: Kreisverwaltung Mayen-Koblenz. pp. 284–287. ISSN 0944-1247.
- Krümmel, Achim. "Höfisches Leben am Mittelrhein unter Clemens Wenzeslaus von Sachsen (1739-1812), Kurfürst und Erzbischof von Trier (1768-1803)". www.rheinische-geschichte.lvr.de (in German).
