= Schönbornslust =

Former summer palace of the Electors of Trier near Koblenz in Germany

Coordinates: 50°23′17.5″N 7°34′41″E

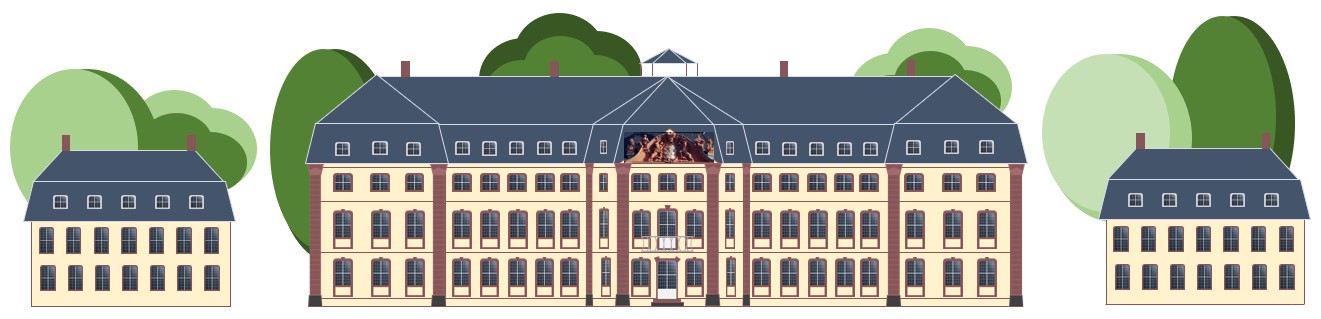
Schönbornslust reconstruction

Schönbornslust (German: Schloss Schönbornslust) was a palace located in Kesselheim, part of the city of Koblenz in Rhineland-Palatinate, Germany. It was a summer residence and hunting lodge of the Prince-Electors and Archbishops of Trier. It was destroyed by French revolutionary troops in 1794. Today nothing remains of the last palace created by Balthasar Neumann.

== History ==
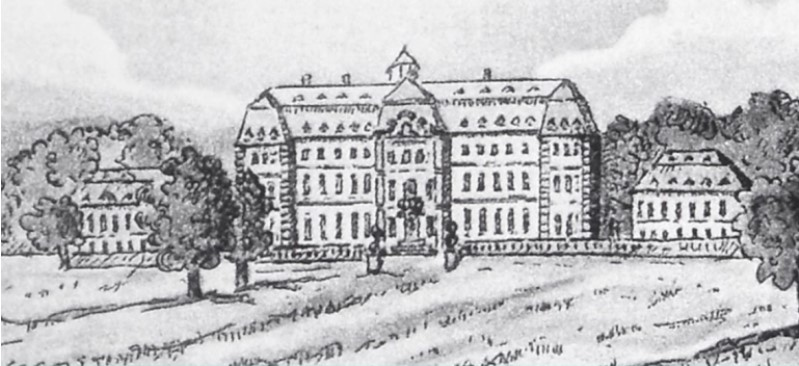
Schönbornslust in 1790

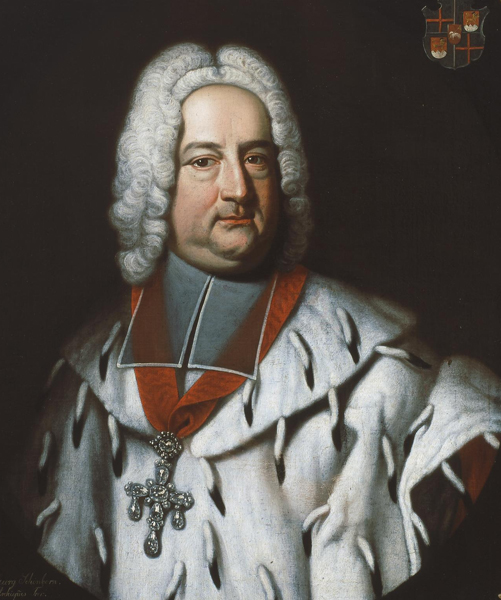
Franz Georg von Schönborn

Prince Elector Franz Georg von Schönborn constructed Schloss Schönbornslust as a hunting lodge between 1748 and 1752. The design was based on plans by Balthasar Neumann and the construction was supervised by his pupil Johannes Seiz. The electoral summer residence was completed in baroque style. It consisted of a single winged building with 21 windows on the front, an orangery and some smaller auxiliary buildings. It was the last completed palace of Balthasar Neumann.

After the start of the French Revolution in 1789, Elector Clemens Wenzeslaus von Sachsen offered refuge in the palace to members of the French royal family (King Louis XVI was his nephew). Also, he allowed Koblenz to become a centre of French monarchism. After the emigrants left the palace, the Prussian king Frederick William II stayed there for a few days in July 1792. Later, the palace was converted into a military hospital for Austrian soldiers.

In the First Coalition War in October 1794, the French revolutionary army approached Koblenz from the North after the battle of Fleurus. Schloss Schönbornslust was in the middle of the fighting and was destroyed. After looting, the palace ruins were sold together and in 1806 completely broken off and levelled. Two economic buildings are located near the former monastery Maria Trost. Today there is a dense industrial area on the location of the palace and nothing remains.

=== Schönbornslust in Maps and Plans ===
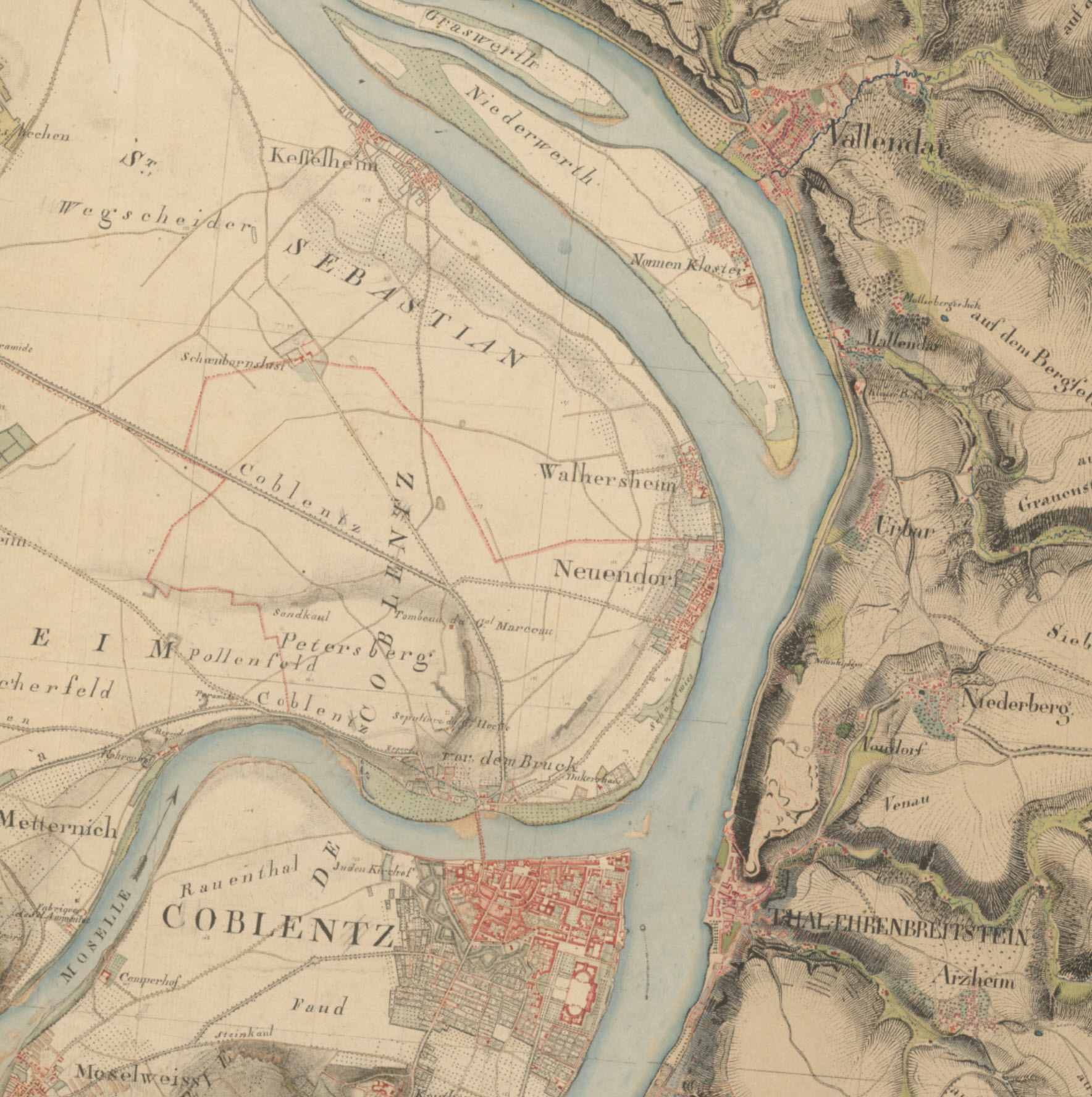
In the map of Rhineland by Tranchot and Von Müffling (1803-1820) shows the location of Schönbornslust lying north of Koblenz and south of Kesselheim. At this moment only the stables were still there

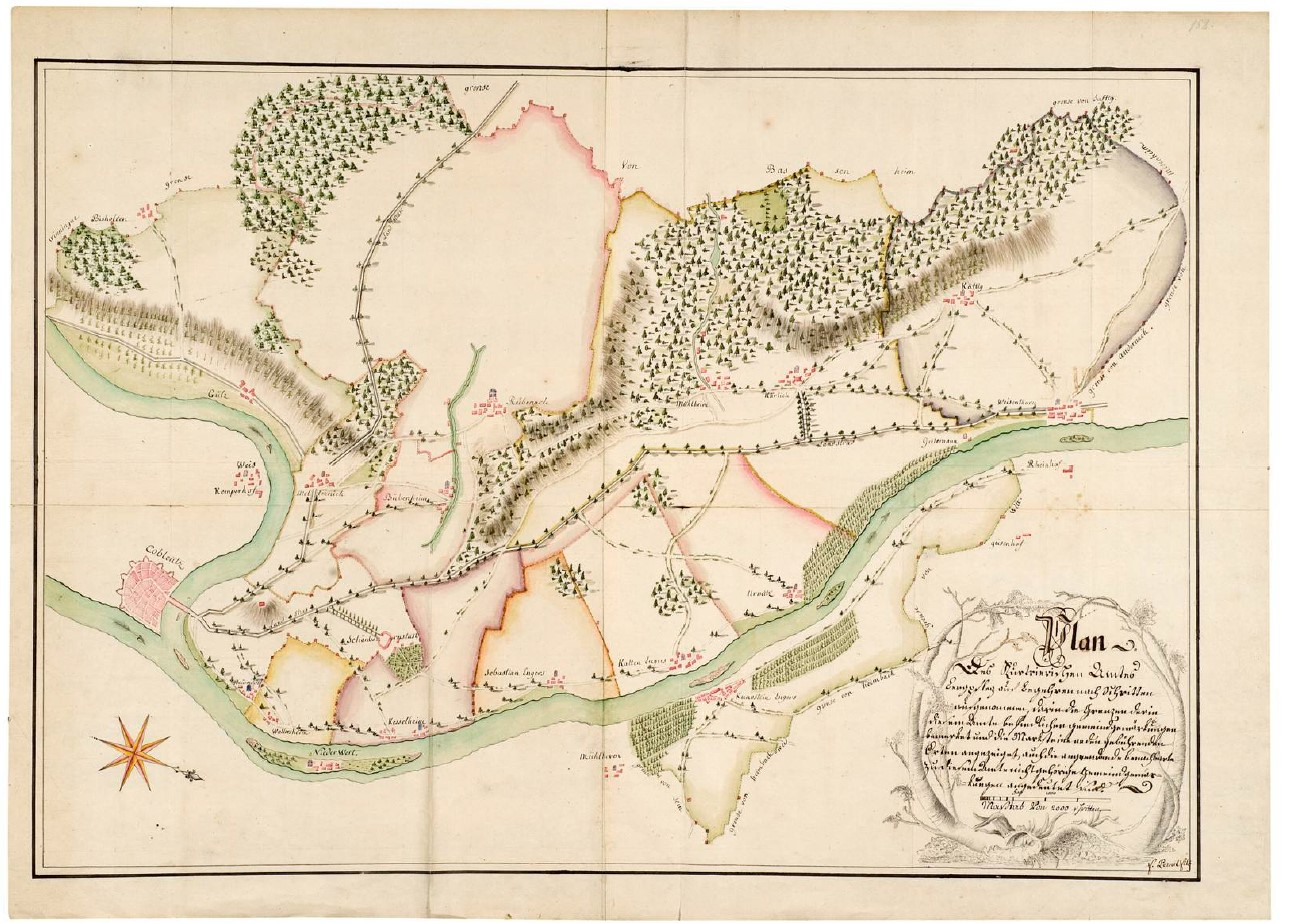
Map of Koblenz and its northern surroundings (2nd half 18th century) showing the residential landscape north of Koblenz with the locations of the palaces Schönbornslust, Kärlich and Engers

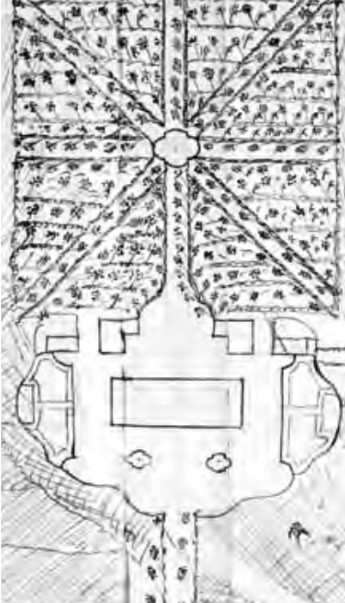
Plan of Schönbornslust and its direct surroundings (1786)

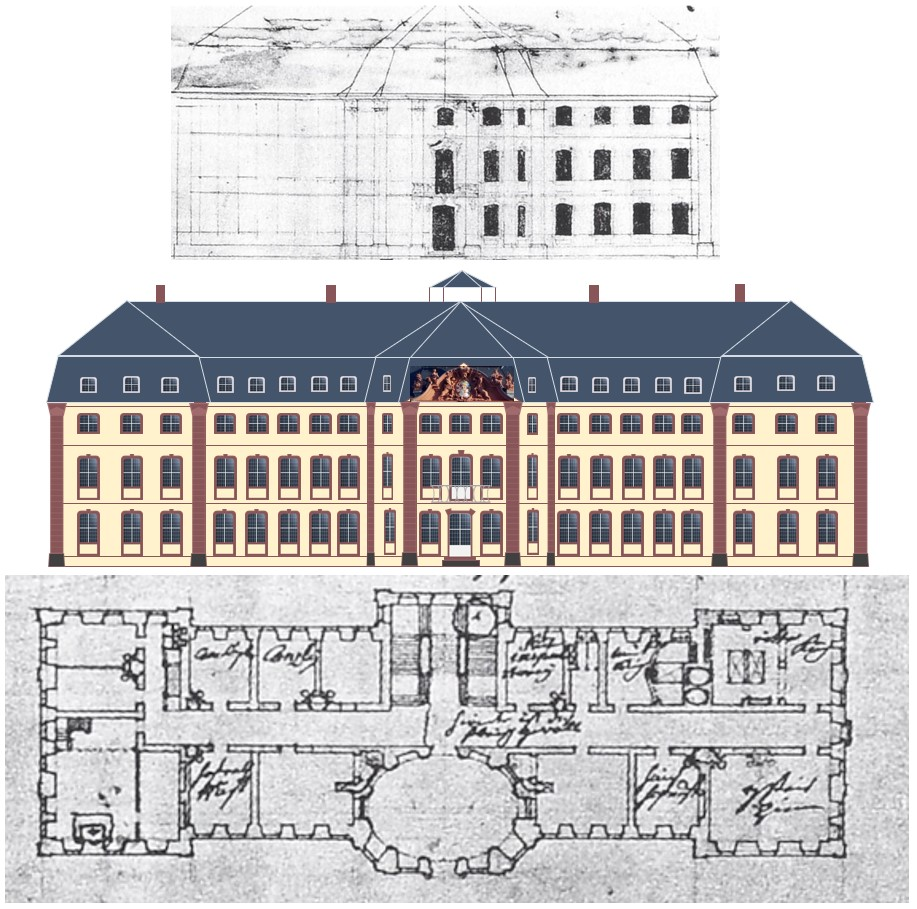
Schönbornslust reconstruction including ground plan and a preliminary design by Balthasar Neumann

== Bibliography ==
- Kuhn, Hans-Wolfgang (1985). "Prüm, Wittlich, Schönbornlust und Kärlich. Vier frühe Veduten von Gottfried Bernhard Manskirsch (1736-1817)". Kurtrierisches Jahrbuch (in German). 25: 191–198.
- Restorff, Jörg (1998). "die Schloss- und Residenzbautätigkeit des kurtrierischen Hofarchitekten Johannes Seiz (1717-1719) unter Johann Philipp von Walderdorff". In Jürgensmeier, Friedhelm (ed.). Die von Walderdorff Acht Jahrhunderte Wechselbeziehungen zwischen Region - Reich - Kirche und einem rheinischen Adelsgeschlecht (in German). Köln: Verlag des Rheinischen Vereins für Denkmalpflege und Landschaftsschutz. pp. 271–296. ISBN 3-88094-832-1.
- Hartmut, G. Urban (2000). "Schloss Schönbornslust – Bemerkungen zu einem ehemaligen kurfürstlichen Sommerschloss bei Koblenz". Burgen und Schlösser (in German). 41: 58–65.
- Raible, Catharina (2008). "Balthasar Neumanns Schloss Schönbornslust bei Koblenz : Rekonstruktion und Analyse anhand des Baubefundes sowie der schriftlichen und bildlichen Quellen". Koblenzer Beiträge zur Geschichte und Kultur (in German). 15/16. Koblenz: Görres Verlag: 7–42.
- Björnsen Beratende Ingenieure GmbH (2011). Maria Trost. Firmenstandort mit Geschichte (in German). Koblenz: Björnsen Beratende Ingenieure GmbH.

== See also ==
Other palaces, residences and hunting lodges of the Prince-Electors of Trier:

- Electoral Palace, Koblenz
- Electoral Palace, Trier
- The yellow castle of Montabaur
- Schloss Engers
- Schloss Kärlich
- Schloss Philippsburg (Koblenz)
- Schloss Philippsfreude
