= Villa Musica =

German foundation

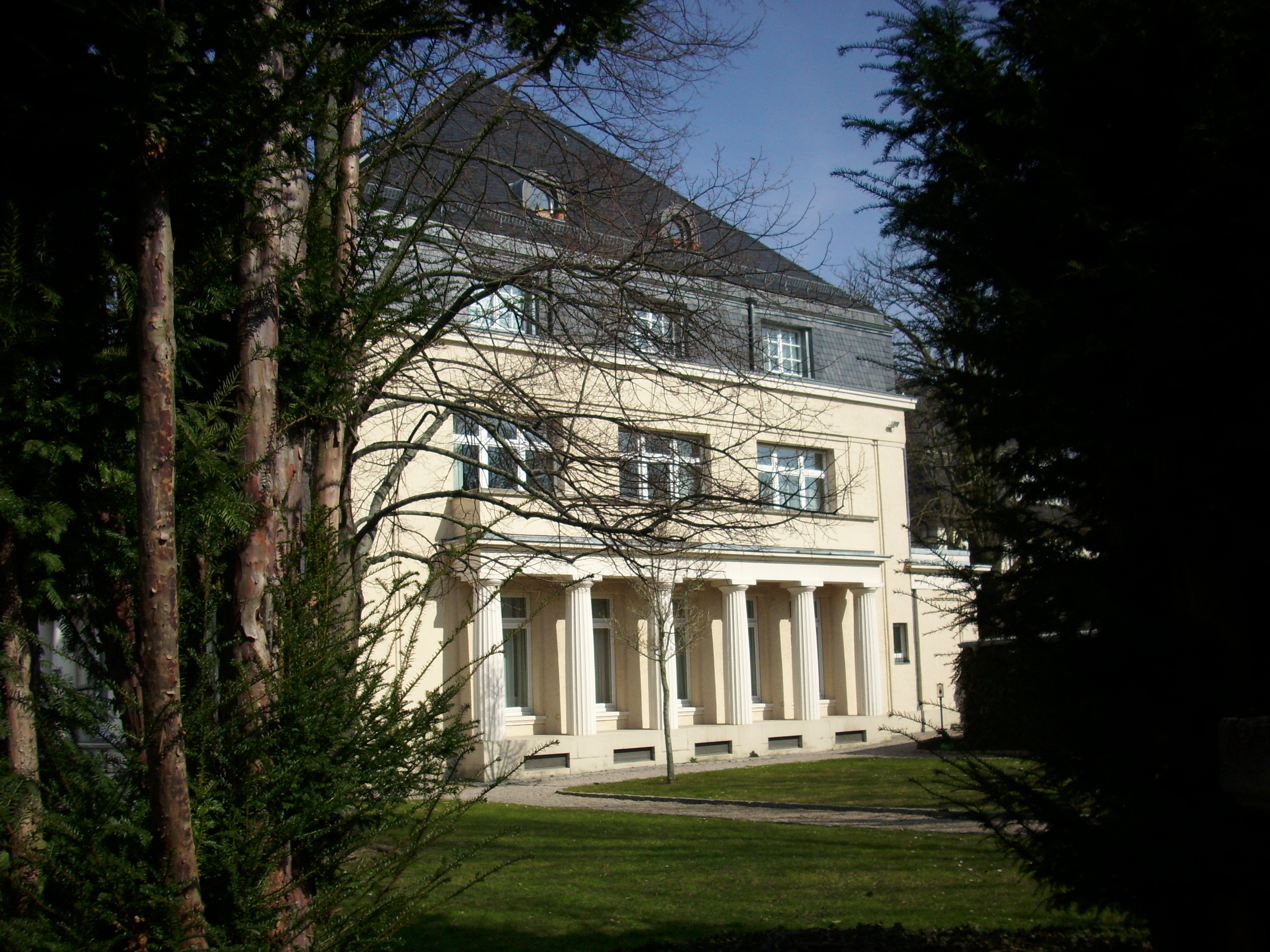
Main building of Villa Musica

Villa Musica is a foundation of the German state Rhineland-Palatinate and the broadcaster Südwestrundfunk. Its goals are to support young performers of classical music and to run concerts. It is based in Mainz at the Bastion Alexander. A second institute of the foundation, the Akademie für Kammermusik (Academy of Chamber Music), is located at Schloss Engers in Neuwied.

== History ==
The foundation was founded in 1986 by the government of Rhineland-Palatinate and the broadcaster, then the Südwestfunk. They have organized more than 1000 concerts, mainly of chamber music.

Highly gifted young musicians are selected in Vorspiel (recital). They then play with their teachers, both in rehearsal as in concert.

The foundation organizes around 150 concerts per year, with about 60% of them dedicated to young performers. Other concerts include a series "Musik in Burgen und Schlössern" (Music in castles and palaces) as part of the annual summer festival Kultursommer Rheinland-Pfalz. Concerts are also taken to rural areas all over the state.

In 2014, the foundation was awarded the Kunstpreis (Art prize) of the Ike und Berthold Roland-Stiftung.
