= Schloss Engers =

Former electoral summer palace in Engers, Germany

Coordinates: 50°25′21″N 7°32′36″E

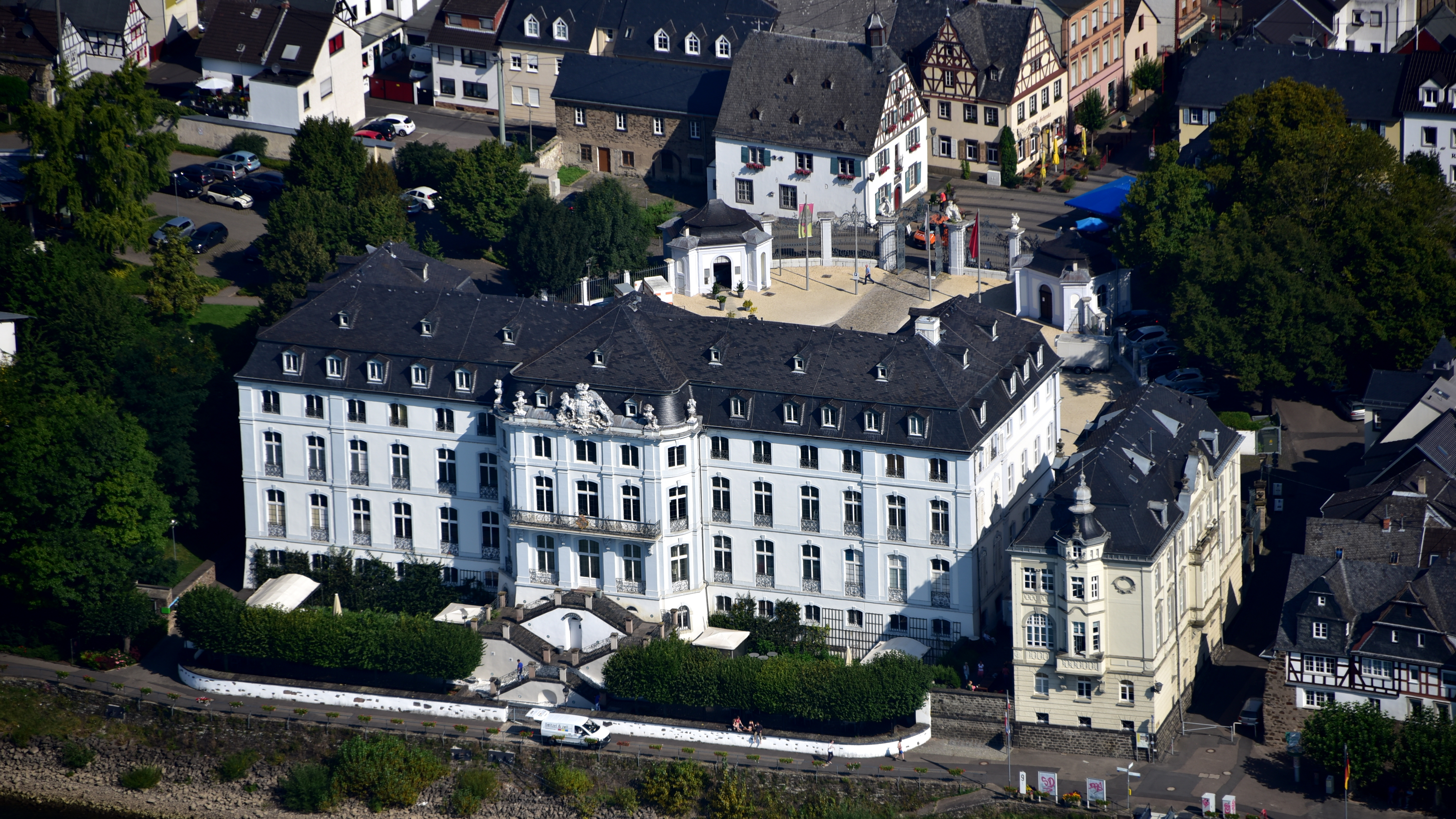
Schloss Engers from the air (2017)

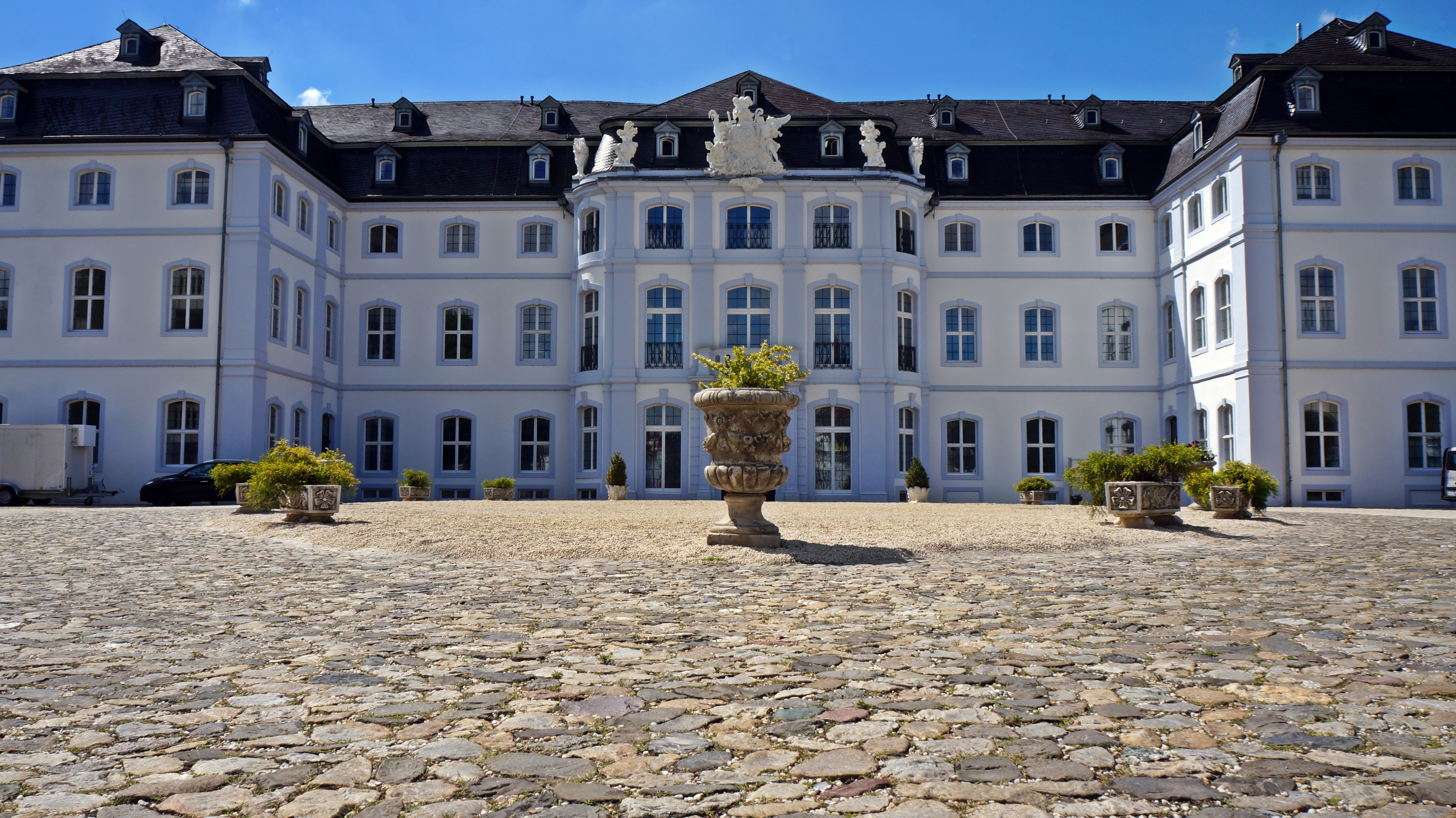
Schloss Engers (2016)

Schloss Engers (English: Engers palace) is a Baroque-style palace in Engers, near Koblenz, Germany. It is situated on the banks of the Rhine river. Johann IX Philipp von Walderdorff (1701–1768), Prince-Elector of Trier, constructed the palace between 1759 and 1764 based on a design by the architect Johanness Seiz. It served both as summer palace and hunting lodge.

Today the palace is now one of the two locations of Villa Musica, a foundation of the German state Rhineland-Palatinate and the broadcaster Südwestrundfunk. Its goals are to support young performers of classical music and to run concerts. Also, it houses a museum with old musical instruments and paintings of Prince-Electors of Trier.

== History ==
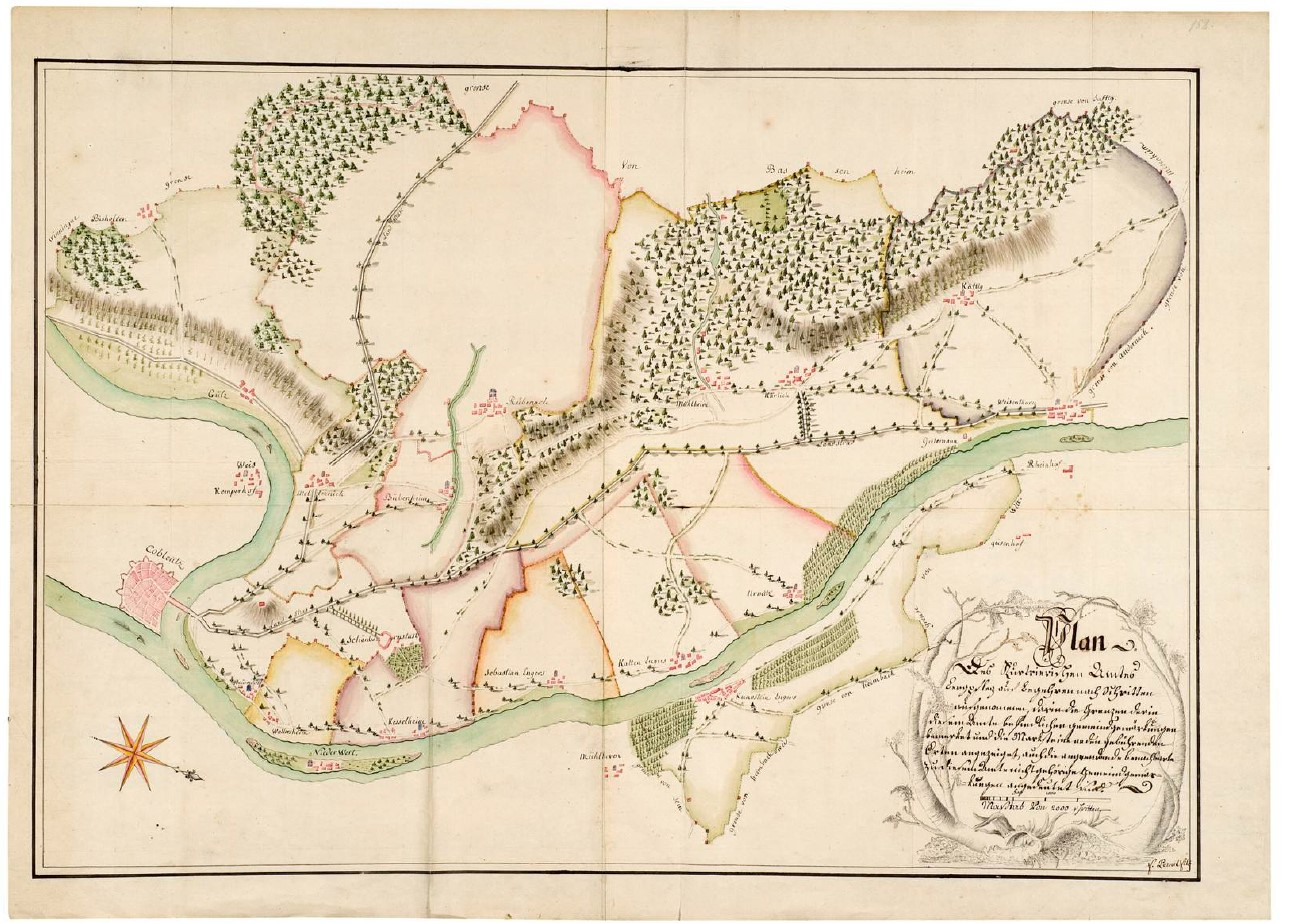
Map of Koblenz and its northern surroundings (2nd half 18th century) showing the residential landscape north of Koblenz with the locations of the palaces Schönbornslust, Kärlich and Engers

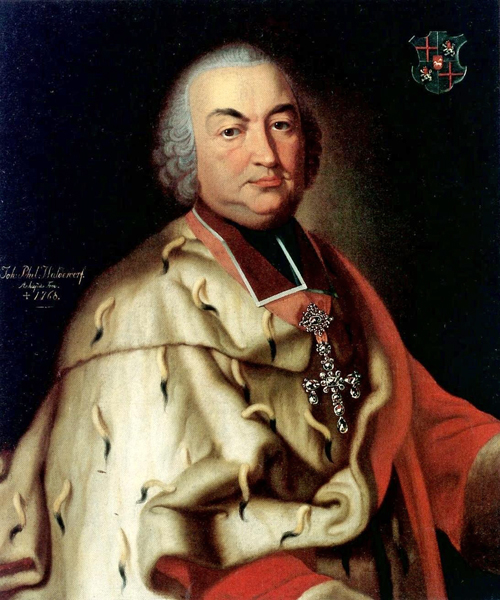
Johann Philipp von Walderdorff

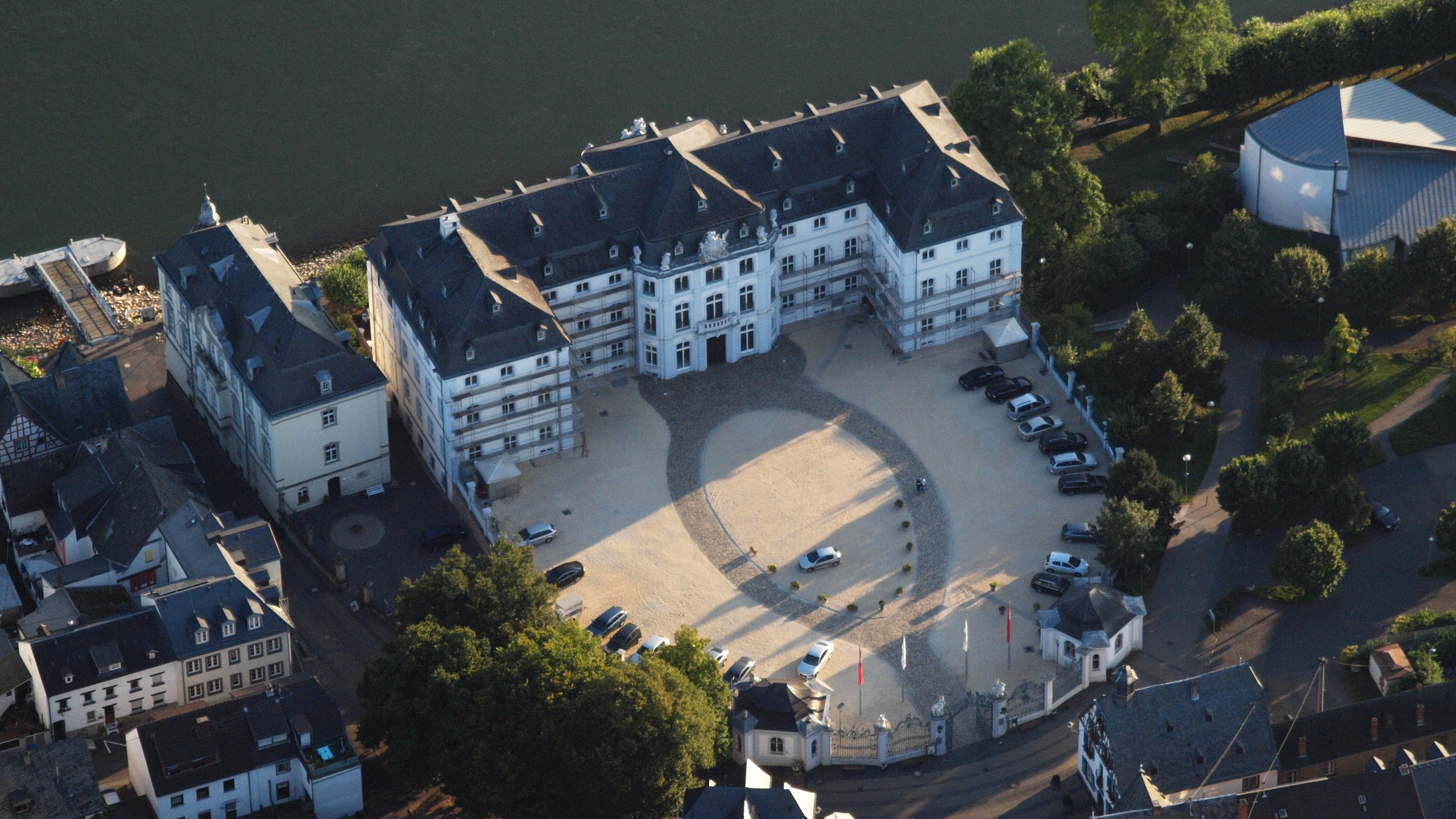
Schloss Engers from the east from the air (2013)

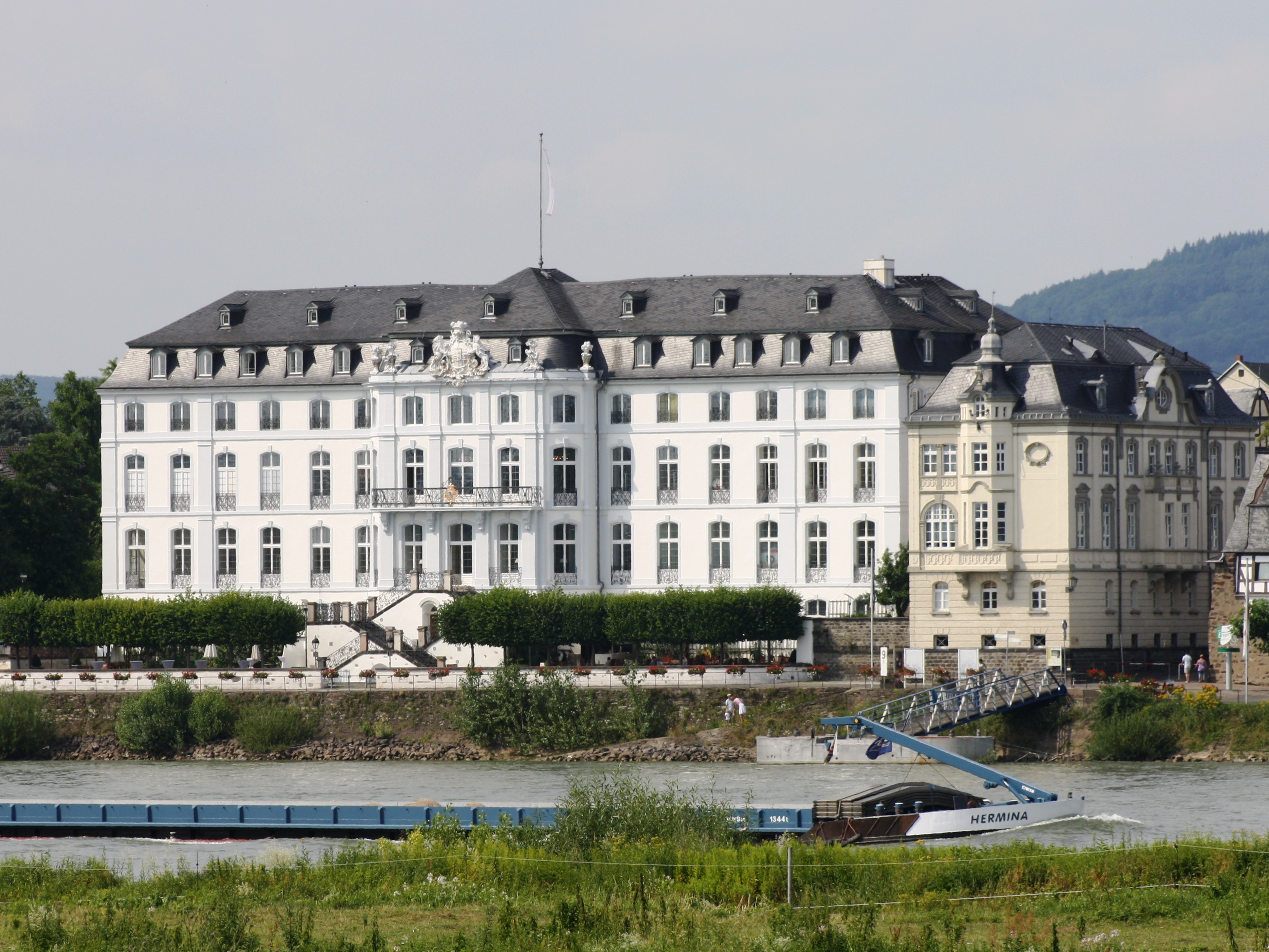
Schloss Engers seen from the opposite bank of the Rhine

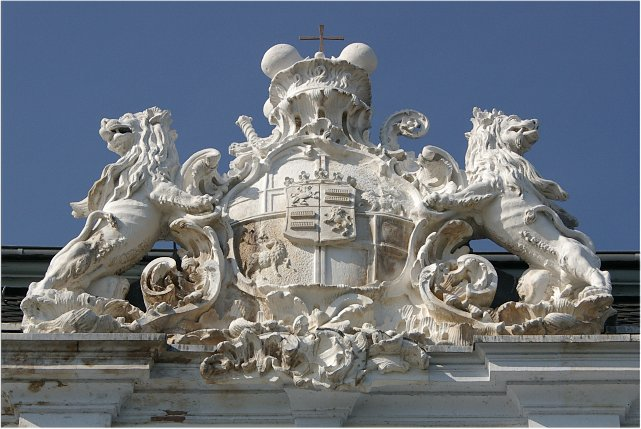
Coat of arms at the Engers palace facade

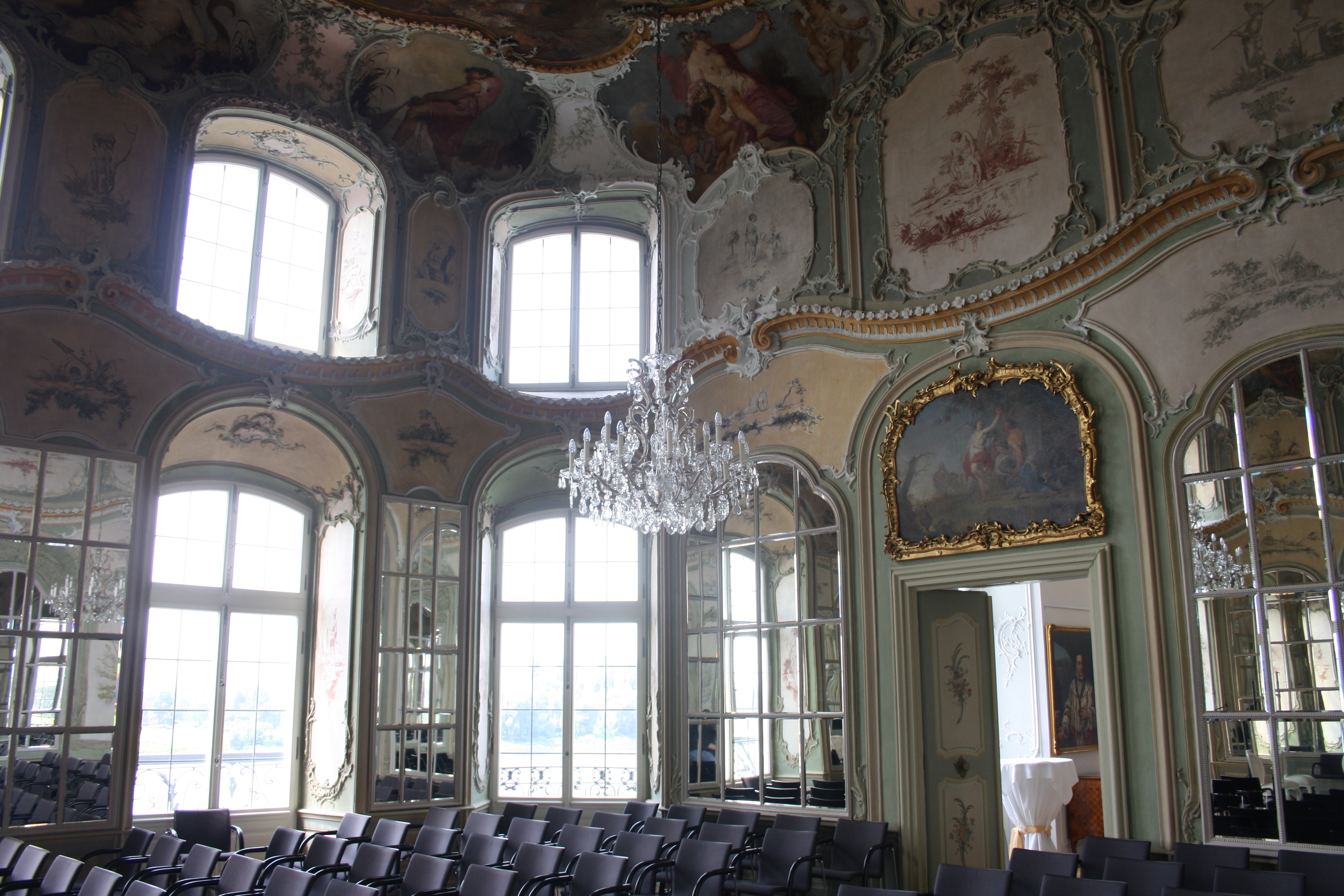
Interior of Schloss Engers: Diana's Hall

=== Kunostein castle ===
Kuno II of Falkenstein (1320–1388), Archbishop and Prince-Elector of Trier, acquired the town of Engers in 1371 and built Kunostein Castle on the banks of the Rhine. His brother and successor, Werner von Falkenstein (1355–1418), relocated the toll station from Stolzenfels Castle near Koblenz to Engers. From then, Kunostein Castle became a Toll castle. It survived the medieval period without significant destruction.

In 1757, the then Archbishop and Prince-Elector of Trier, Johann Philipp von Walderdorff, decided to modernize the castle. This undertaking is interpreted as a reaction to the founding of the town of Neuwied. He changed his plans and had the castle demolished in 1758. Today, the Gray Tower of the old toll station remains.

=== Electoral summer palace and hunting lodge ===
Johann Philipp von Walderdorff commissioned the architect Johannes Seiz, a student of Balthasar Neumann, to build a new summer palace and hunting lodge on the site of the former Kunostein castle. The design is in late baroque-style. Construction happened between 1759 and 1762. Johannes Seiz involved stuccoist Michael Eytel, painter Januarius Zick from Koblenz, and sculptor Ferdinand Dietz to help with the interior. Since then, the palace remained more or less unchanged.

The Prince-Elector only stayed at Schloss Engers during the hunting season in September each year. For the rest of the time, the castle was unoccupied and was opened for visiting travellers.

The Prince-Elector would often come by barge from the Philippsburg palace in Koblenz over the Rhine to Engers.

The Elector also had other palaces and hunting lodges built in: a transformation of his family castle in Molsberg, the Electoral palace in Trier and Wittlich, Schloss Philippsfreude. Further, he was responsible for the furnishing of Schloss Schönbornslust, which construction was started under his predecessor, Franz Georg von Schönborn (1682–1756).

=== 19th and 20th centuries ===
After the end of the Electorate, the castle was assigned to the Prince of Nassau-Weilburg as a summer residence in 1803. Following the Congress of Vienna, Engers became part of Prussia, and between 1862 and 1914, the site was used as a military school . During the wars of 1870/71 and between 1914 and 1917, it served as a reserve hospital.

In 1928, the site was sold to the Josefs-Gesellschaft, and a home, healing, and educational institution for people with disabilities was established. The hospital school evolved into the Christiane Herzog School, which is part of the Heinrich-Haus and focuses on motor development.

=== Modern times ===
In 1990, the castle building was taken over by the state of Rhineland-Palatinate and has housed the state foundation Villa Musica since 1995.

Directly adjacent to the castle upstream is the neo-baroque residential house for the masters (known as the Meisterhaus), built around 1900, who were trained at Heinrich-Haus. The renovated building now houses the State Music Academy of Rhineland-Palatinate since 2003.

== Panorama ==
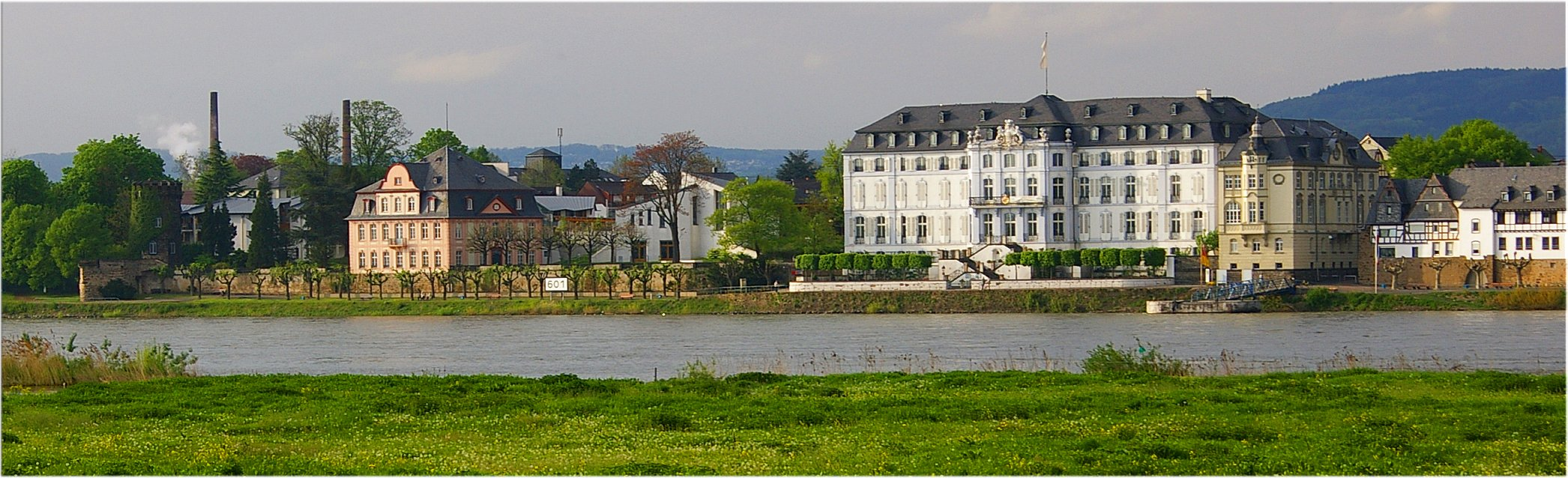
Engers and Schloss Engers

== Literature ==
- Restorff, Jörg (1998). "die Schloß- und Residenzbautätigkeit des kurtrierischen Hofarchitekten Johannes Seiz (1717-1719) unter Johann Philipp von Walderdorff". In Jürgensmeier, Friedhelm (ed.). Die von Walderdorff Acht Jahrhunderte Wechselbeziehungen zwischen Region - Reich - Kirche und einem rheinischen Adelsgeschlecht (in German). Köln: Verlag des Rheinischen Vereins für Denkmalpflege und Landschaftsschutz. pp. 271–296. ISBN 3-88094-832-1.
- Backes, Magnus (1999). Wegweiser Mittelrhein Spätrenaissance und Barock (in German). Koblenz: Görres-Verlag. ISBN 3-920388-71-2.
- Holdorf, Martina (1999). Wegweiser Mittelrhein Burgen und Schlösser (in German). Koblenz: Görres-Verlag. pp. 26–27. ISBN 3-920388-73-9.
- Restorff, Jörg; Meißner, Jan (2003). Schloss Engers (Führungshefte der Edition Burgen, Schlösser, Altertümer Rheinland-Pfalz) (in German). Regensburg: Schnell und Steiner. p. 52. ISBN 978-3795414597.

== See also ==
Other palaces, residences and hunting lodges of the Prince-Electors of Trier:

- Electoral Palace, Koblenz
- Electoral Palace, Trier
- The yellow castle of Montabaur
- Schloss Kärlich
- Schloss Philippsburg (Koblenz)
- Schloss Philippsfreude
- Schloss Schönbornslust
