= Schloss Philippsfreude =

Schloss in Wittlich, Germany

Coordinates: 49°59′08″N 6°53′25″E

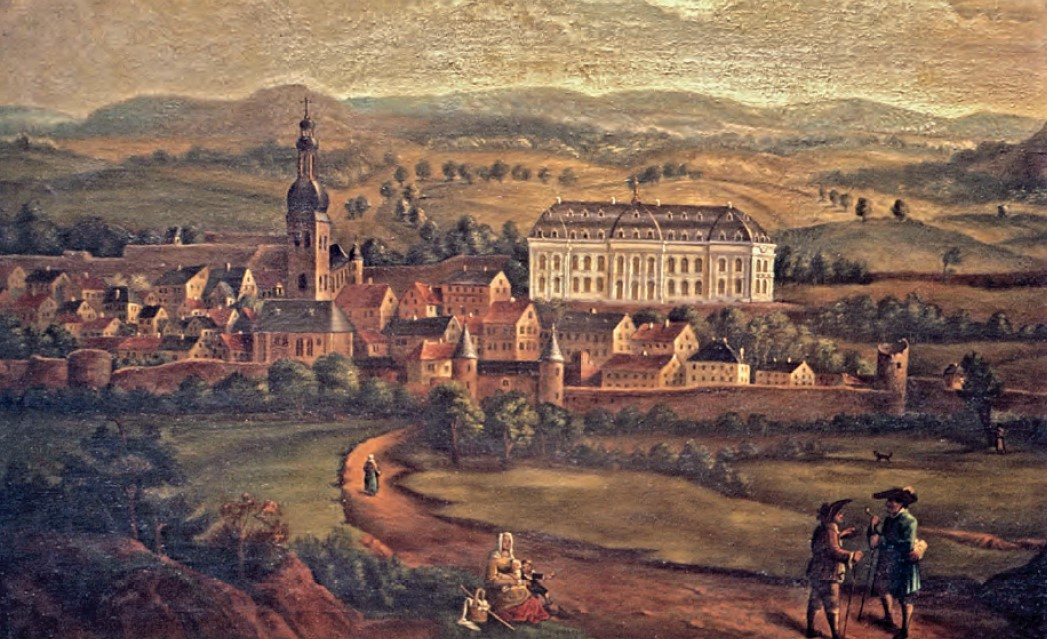
Schloss Philippsfreude around 1760

Schloss Philippsfreude (German: Schloss Philippsfreude) was a rococo Schloss in Wittlich in Rhineland-Palatinate, Germany. It served as a hunting lodge and summer palace for the Prince-Electors of Trier. It was destroyed by French revolutionary troops in 1794. Today, nothing is left anymore.

== History ==
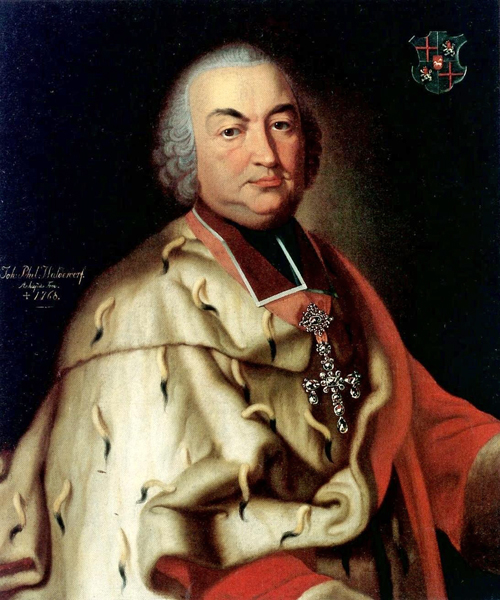
Johann Philipp von Walderdorff

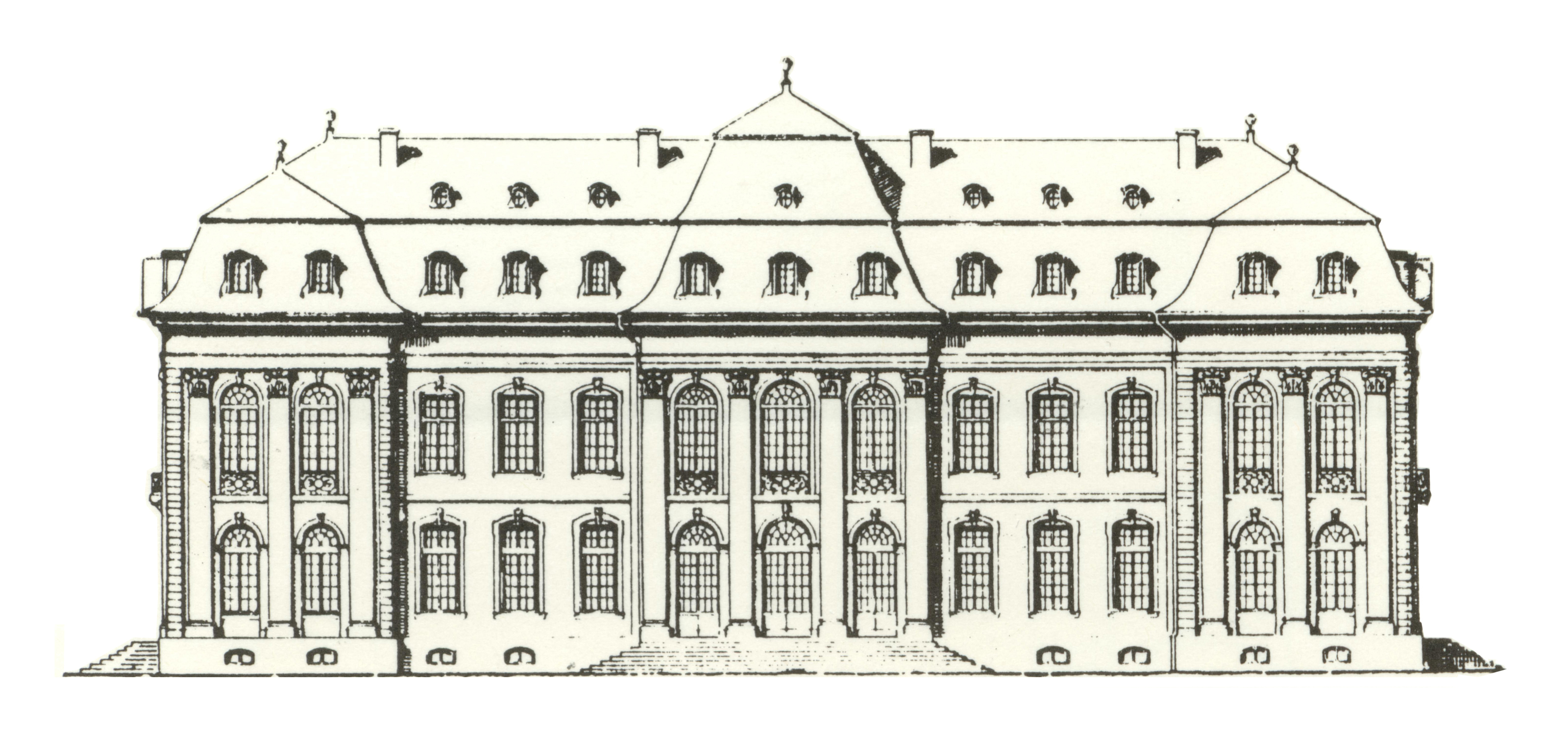
Sketch of Schloss Philippsfreude

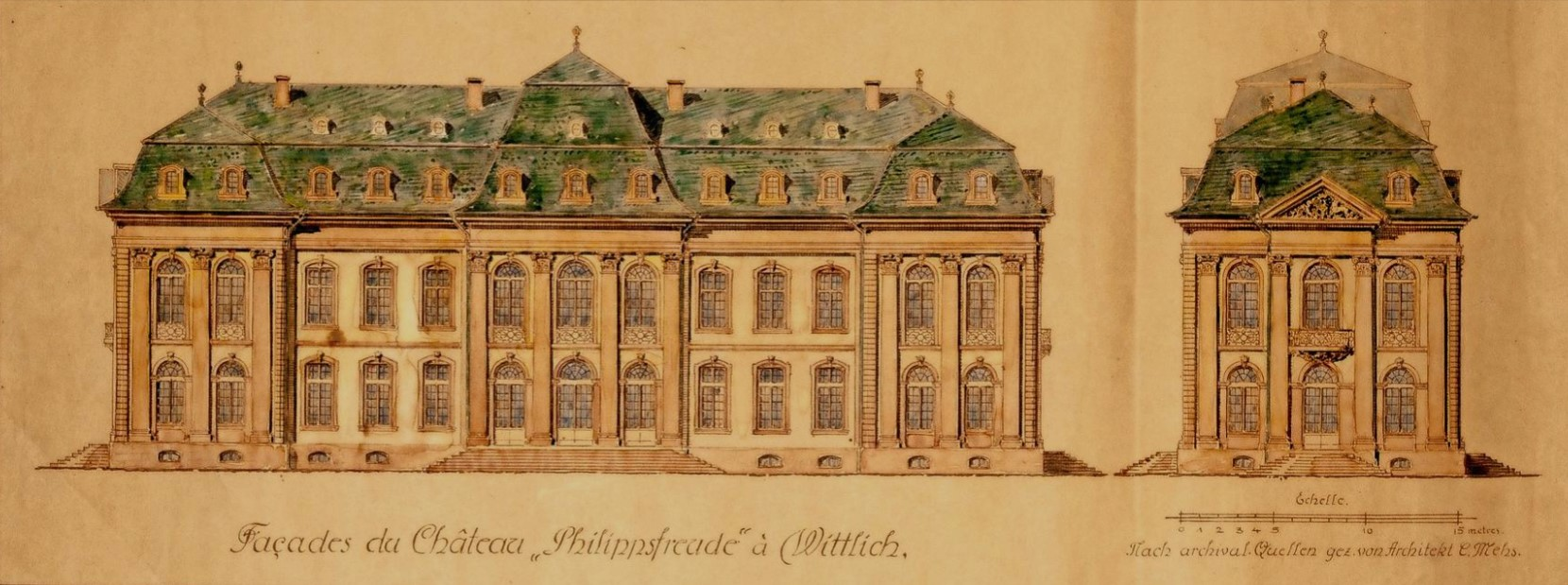
Reconstruction of Schloss Philippsfreude by Claus Mehs

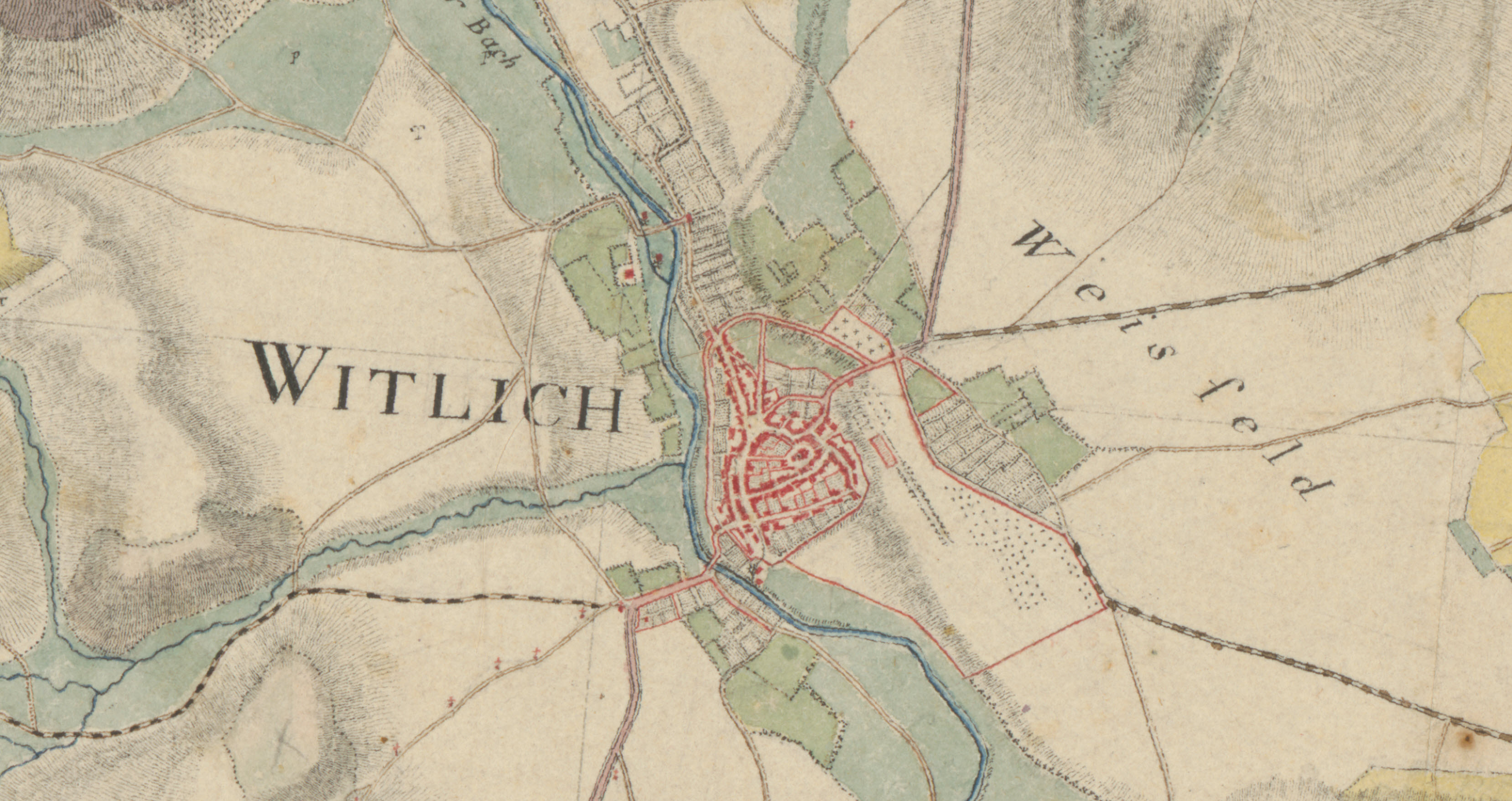
In the map of Rhineland by Tranchot and Von Müffling (1803-1820) shows Schloss Philippsfreude right of Wittlich

Werner von Falkenstein, Prince Elector and Archbishop of Trier, constructed a castle in Wittlich in 1402, called Burg Ottenstein. The castle was renovated and transformed various times up to in the 18th century. The prince-electors used the castle as a hunting lodge. In 1761, prince-elector and archbishop Johann IX Philipp von Walderdorff ordered the demolition of the castle in order to replace it by a new palace on the same location, Schloss Philippsfreude. The architect was Jean Antoine, who was preferred over the court architect Johannes Seiz. The first stone was laid on 29 March 1762 in presence of the prince-elector. The construction of the palace took only one and half years and was completed in 1763.

The palace was designed in the style of the French rococo. It was destroyed by French revolutionary troops in 1794. After which the stones were sold up to 1804.

Only the name of the city square remembers of the palace: 'Schlossplatz' (palace square).

== Bibliography ==
- Kuhn, Hans-Wolfgang (1985). "Prüm, Wittlich, Schönbornlust und Kärlich. Vier frühe Veduten von Gottfried Bernhard Manskirsch (1736-1817)". Kurtrierisches Jahrbuch (in German). 25: 191–198.
- Restorff, Jörg (1998). "die Schloss- und Residenzbautätigkeit des kurtrierischen Hofarchitekten Johannes Seiz (1717-1719) unter Johann Philipp von Walderdorff". In Jürgensmeier, Friedhelm (ed.). Die von Walderdorff Acht Jahrhunderte Wechselbeziehungen zwischen Region - Reich - Kirche und einem rheinischen Adelsgeschlecht (in German). Köln: Verlag des Rheinischen Vereins für Denkmalpflege und Landschaftsschutz. pp. 271–296. ISBN 3-88094-832-1.
- Ulrike Glatz: ... in einer steinernen Urkunde lesen“: Geschichts- und Erinnerungsorte in Rheinland-Pfalz", Nünnerich-Asmus Verlag & Media GmbH (2013)
- Joachim Hupe: 'Burg Ottenstein in Wittlich Neue archäologische Erkenntnisse zuruntergegangenen kurfürstlichen Residenz' in: Trierer Zeitschrift 75/76 (2012/13) Pages 249-282
- Richard Hüttel: '... verloren, vergessen - Das Kurtrierisches Schloss Philippsfreude in Wittlich Eine Spurensuche', Kulturamt der Stadt Wittlich (2019) ISBN 978-3-945454-15-2

== See also ==
Other palaces, residences and hunting lodges of the Prince-Electors of Trier:

- Electoral Palace, Koblenz
- Electoral Palace, Trier
- The yellow castle of Montabaur
- Schloss Engers
- Schloss Kärlich
- Schloss Philippsburg (Koblenz)
- Schloss Schönbornslust
