= Johann IX Philipp von Walderdorff =

German nobleman and archbishop

Johann Philipp von Walderdorff
- Archbishop-Elector of Trier
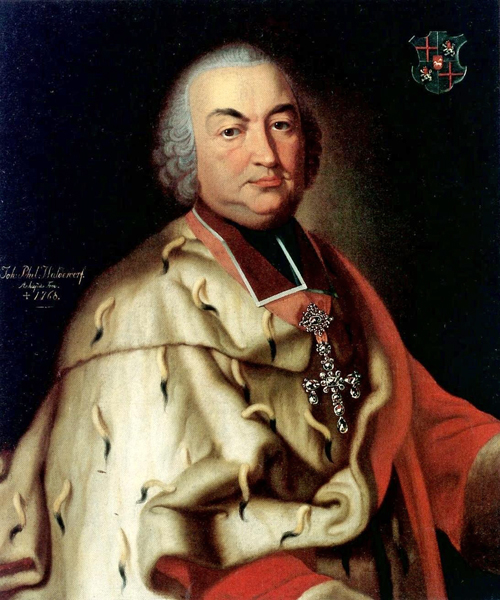
- Portrait by an unknown artist, c. 1760
- Church: Catholic Church
- Archdiocese: Trier
- In office: 1756–1768
- Predecessor: Franz Georg von Schönborn
- Successor: Clemens Wenceslaus of Saxony

Orders
- Ordination: 29 January 1736 (Deacon); 7 October 1742 (Priest)
- Consecration: 15 Jun 1755 (Bishop) by Franz Georg von Schönborn

Personal details
- Born: 24 or 26 May 1701; Molsberg Castle, Montabaur
- Died: 12 January 1768 (aged 66); Ehrenbreitstein (today Koblenz)

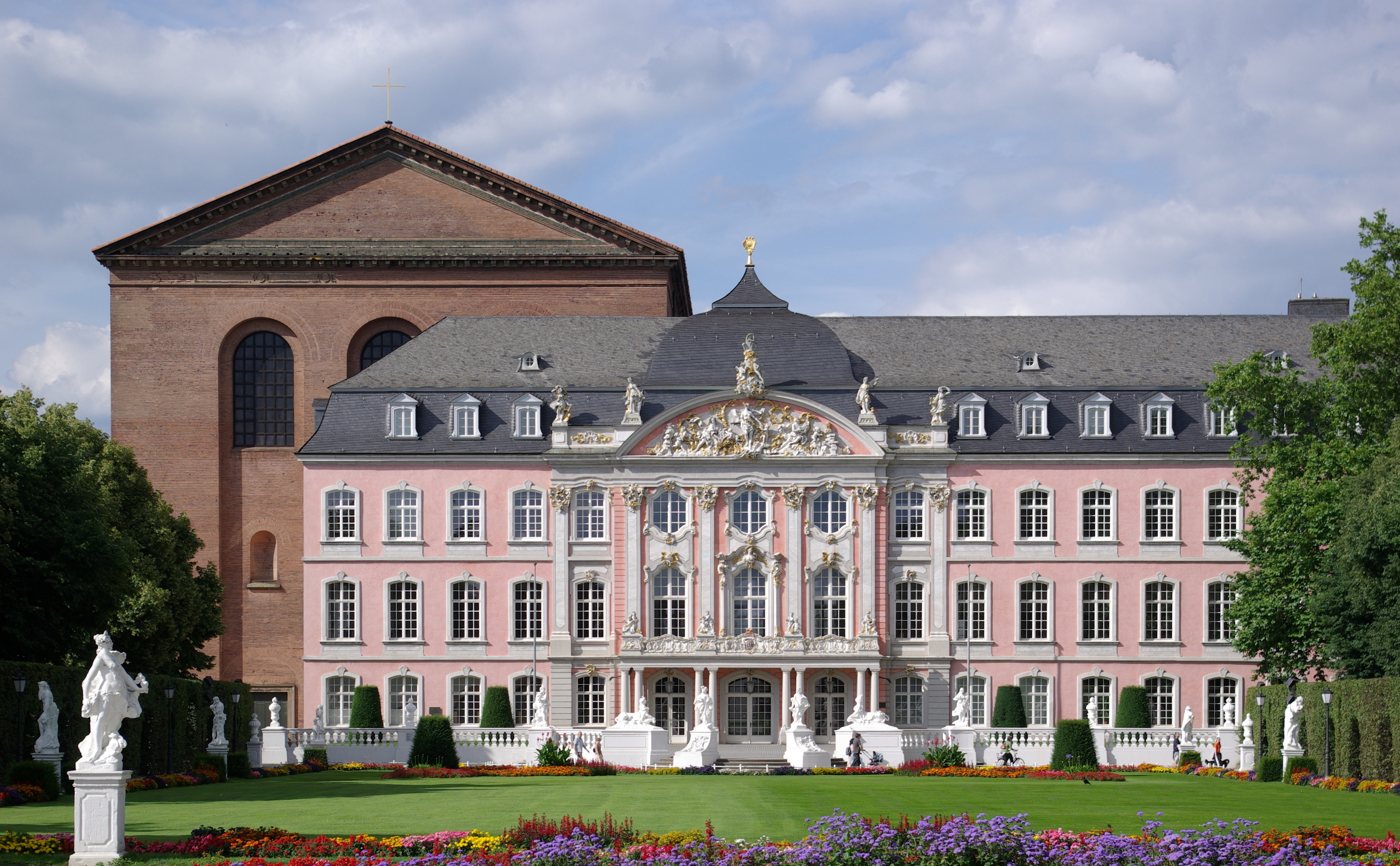
Electoral Palace in Trier, partly built by Johann Philipp von Walderdorff

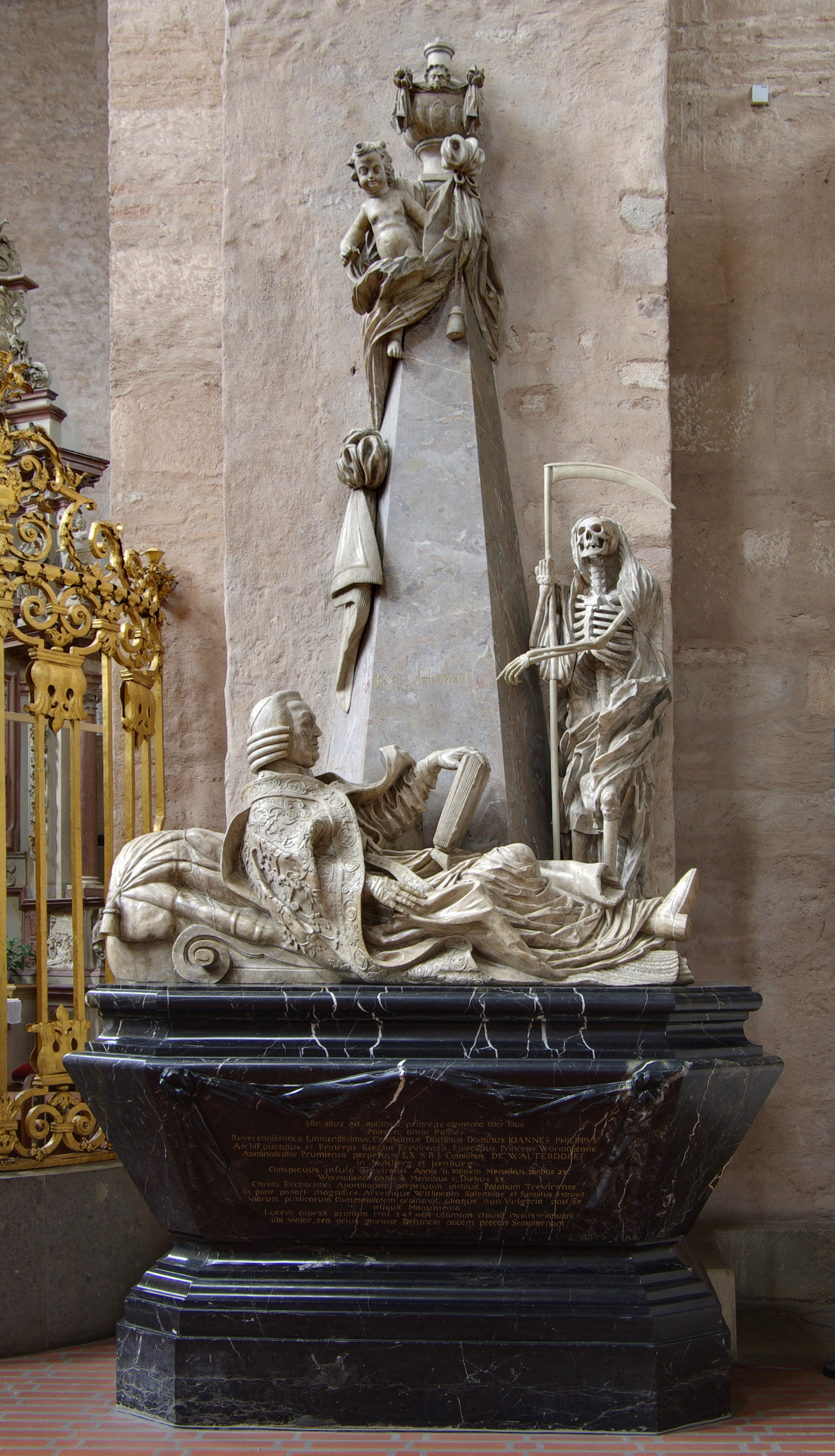
Memorial in the Cathedral of Trier

Johann Philipp von Walderdorff (24 or 26 May 1701 – 12 January 1768) was a German nobleman who served as Archbishop and Elector of Trier from 1756 and as Prince-Bishop of Worms from 1763 until his death in 1768.

== Biography ==
Johann Philipp was born on 24 or 26 May 1701 at Molsberg Castle near Montabaur, in what is now Germany. He was the eighth child of Reichsfreiherr Karl Lothar von Walderdorff zu Molsberg und Isenberg (died 1722) and Anna Katharina Elisabeth Freiin zu Kesselstatt (1671–1733).

Johann Philipp became the general vicar of the upper diocese, and in 1742 was made a governor. With French support, in 1754 he was promoted to be the coadjutor and designated successor of Archbishop-Elector Francis George of Schönborn-Buchheim. In 1756, after Francis died Johann Philipp succeeded him, and in 1763 he was also elected the Prince-Bishop of Worms.

Johann Philipp reconstructed parts of the Electoral Palace in Trier, Schloss Engers near Koblenz, Schloss Philippsfreude in Wittlich and his family's castle of Molsberg in Westerwald. He was Abraham Roentgen's best client, purchasing more than two dozen Roentgen pieces. He died in 1768.

Johann IX Philipp von Walderdorff Born: 24 or 26 May 1701 Died: 12 January 1768
Catholic Church titles
Regnal titles
Preceded by Franz Georg von Schönborn-Buchheim	Archbishop-Elector of Trier and Prince-Abbot of Prüm as Johann IX; 1756–1768	Succeeded by Prince Clemens Wenceslaus of Saxony
Preceded by Johann Friedrich Karl von Ostein	Prince-Bishop of Worms; 1763–1768	Succeeded by Emmerich Joseph von Breidbach-Bürresheim
