= Gatermann =

Gatermann is a German surname. Notable people with the surname include:

- Dörte Gatermann (born 1956), German architect
- Karin Gatermann (1961–2005), German mathematician
- Karl Gatermann the Elder (1883–1959), German painter
- Karl Gatermann the Younger (1909–1992), German painter
