= Karl Gatermann =

Karl Gatermann may refer to:

- Karl Gatermann the Elder (1883–1959), German painter
- Karl Gatermann the Younger (1909–1992), German painter
