= Rabus =

Rabus is a German language surname. Notable people with the name include:

- Carl Rabus (1898–1983), German expressionist artist and painter
- Karl Rabus (1800–1857), Russian architectural painter and art teacher
- Ludwig Rabus (1523–1592), German Lutheran theologian and Protestant reformer
