= Rheinseilbahn =

Rheinseilbahn ('Rhine Cable Car') may refer to one of two cable cars across the Rhine in Germany:

- Cologne Cable Car
- Koblenz cable car
