= Electoral Palace, Koblenz =

German palace

Coordinates: 50°21′20.21″N 7°36′07.08″E

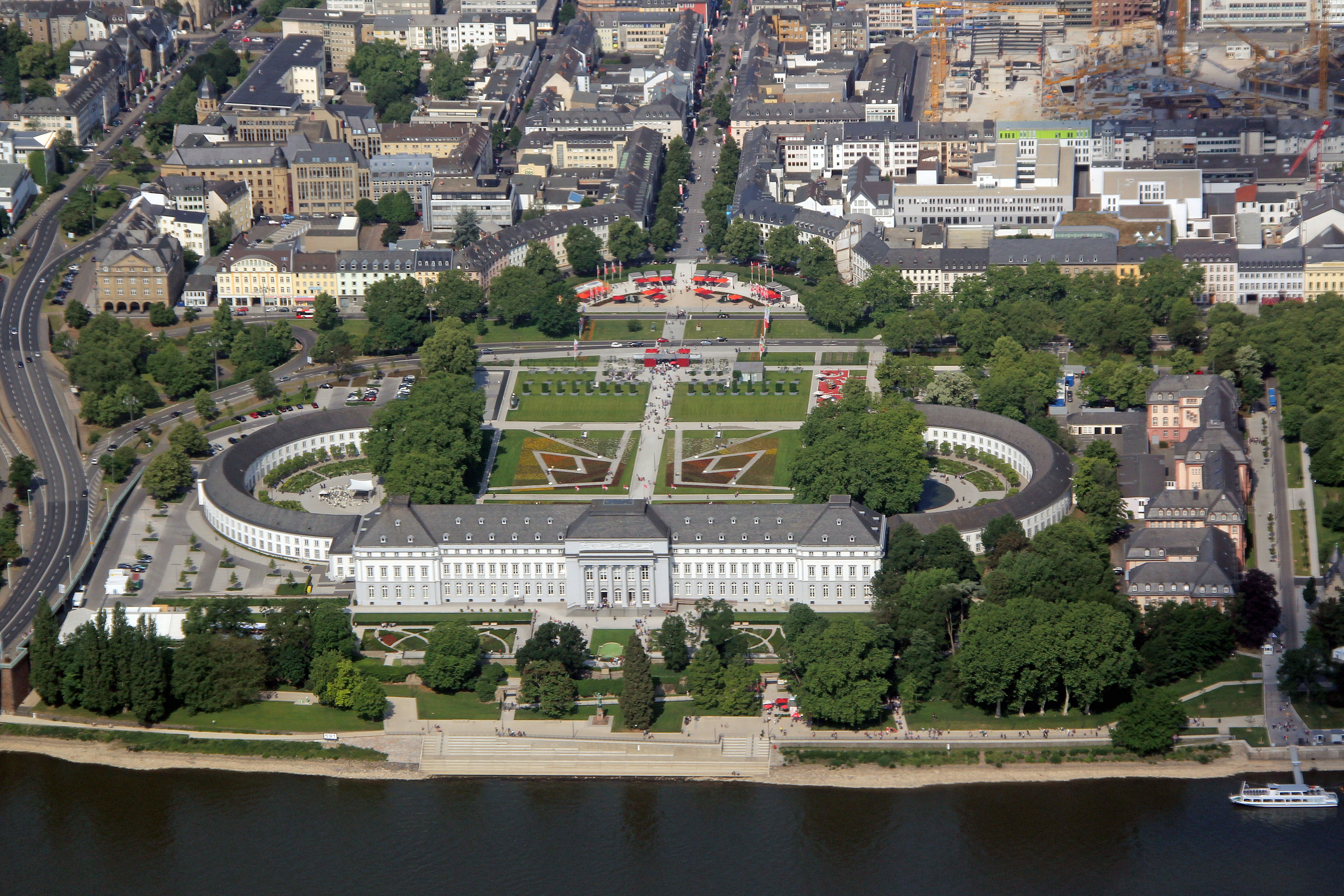
Aerial view of the Electoral Palace in 2011 during the German Federal Horticultural Show

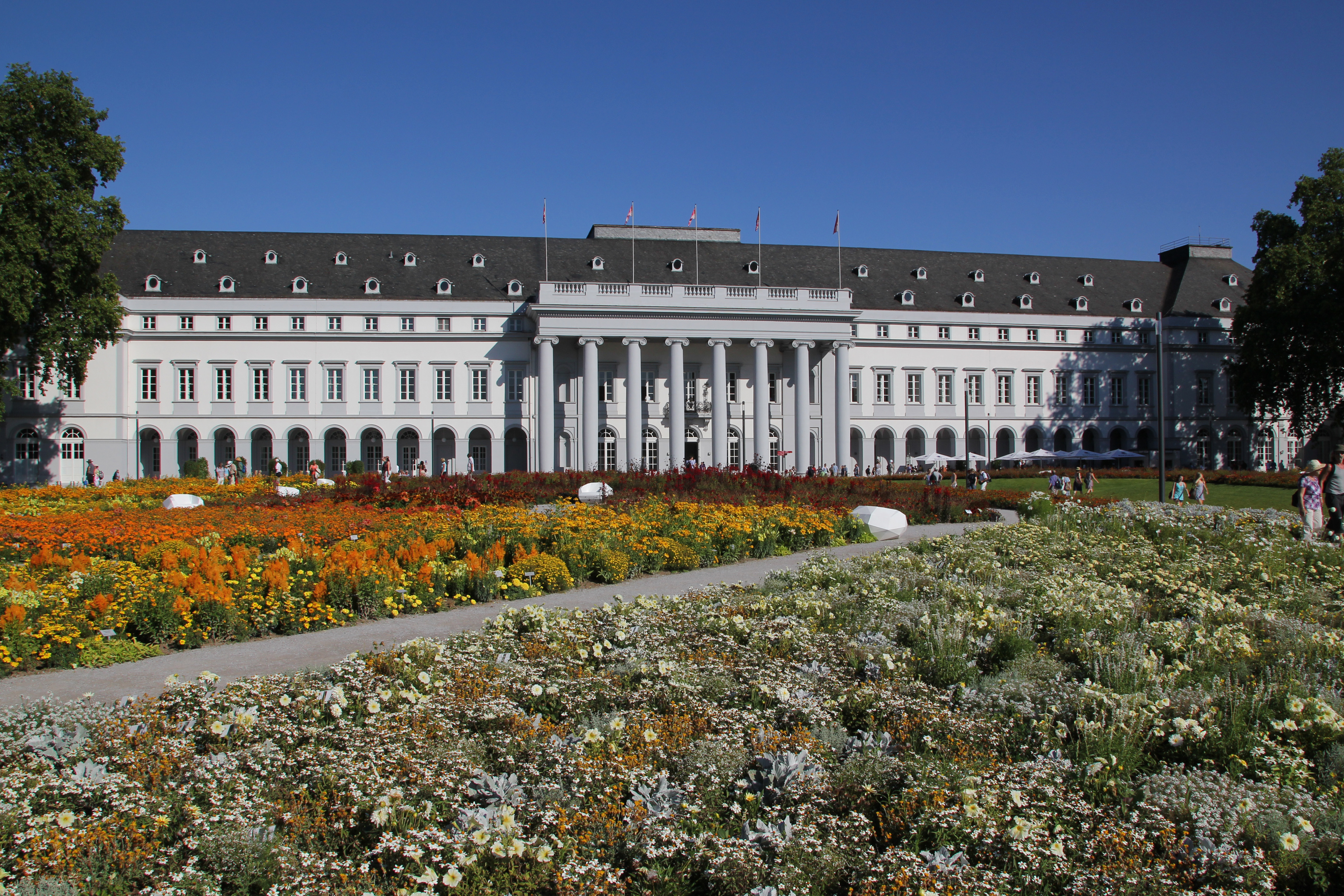
Main (west) façade of the palace

The Electoral Palace (German: Kurfürstliches Schloss) in Koblenz, was the residence of the last Archbishop and Elector of Trier, Clemens Wenceslaus of Saxony, who commissioned the building in the late 18th century. In the mid-19th century, the Prussian Crown Prince (later Emperor Wilhelm I) had his official residence there during his years as military governor of the Rhine Province and the Province of Westphalia. It now houses various offices of the federal government.

The Electoral Palace is one of the most important examples of the early French neoclassical great house in Southwestern Germany, and with Schloss Wilhelmshöhe in Kassel, the Prince Bishop's Palace in Münster and Ludwigsburg Palace, one of the last palaces built in Germany before the French Revolution. Since 2002, it has been part of the Rhine Gorge UNESCO World Heritage Site, and it is also a protected cultural property under the Hague Convention.

== Building ==
The palace consists of a rectangular main building (Corps de logis) which extends in a north-south direction parallel to the nearby bank of the Rhine and two semi-circular wings which extend from it on the west side facing the city, enclosing the great forecourt of the palace (Schlossvorplatz). The main building is predominantly horizontally articulated; five of its 39 axes are emphasised by projecting bays. In the centre of the façade which faces the city, a portico with eight columns rises to the roofline. On the river side, a central bay has six columns and is surmounted by a relief by the sculptor Sebastian Pfaff depicting an allegory of the Rhine and the Mosel, the electoral coat of arms, lions symbolising sovereignty and symbols of the ecclesiastical and temporal power of the Archbishop Electors of Trier. The side wings, which were rebuilt to a height of two storeys in the 1950s, are unarticulated.

In commissioning the relatively unornamented and austere building from French architects, Clemens Wenceslaus broke with the previous tradition in Koblenz of architecture in the French and German Baroque tradition. It was built as a residence and city palace. However, as a function of its location on the bank of the Rhine, it was conceived of as part of the river landscape, and the rooms are so arranged as to either draw attention to the landscape or refer to it. From the entrance facing the city, the intended path leads through the vestibule and garden room to the palace garden on the riverbank. The rooms on the south and east sides offer an impressive view of the Middle Rhine Valley. The embracing of the landscape was in response to Clemens Wenceslaus' wish. The grand gesture of the forecourt encircled by the colonnaded wings has older antecedents, such as the colonnades of St. Peter's Square in Rome, the New Palace in Bayreuth, and Schwetzingen Castle.

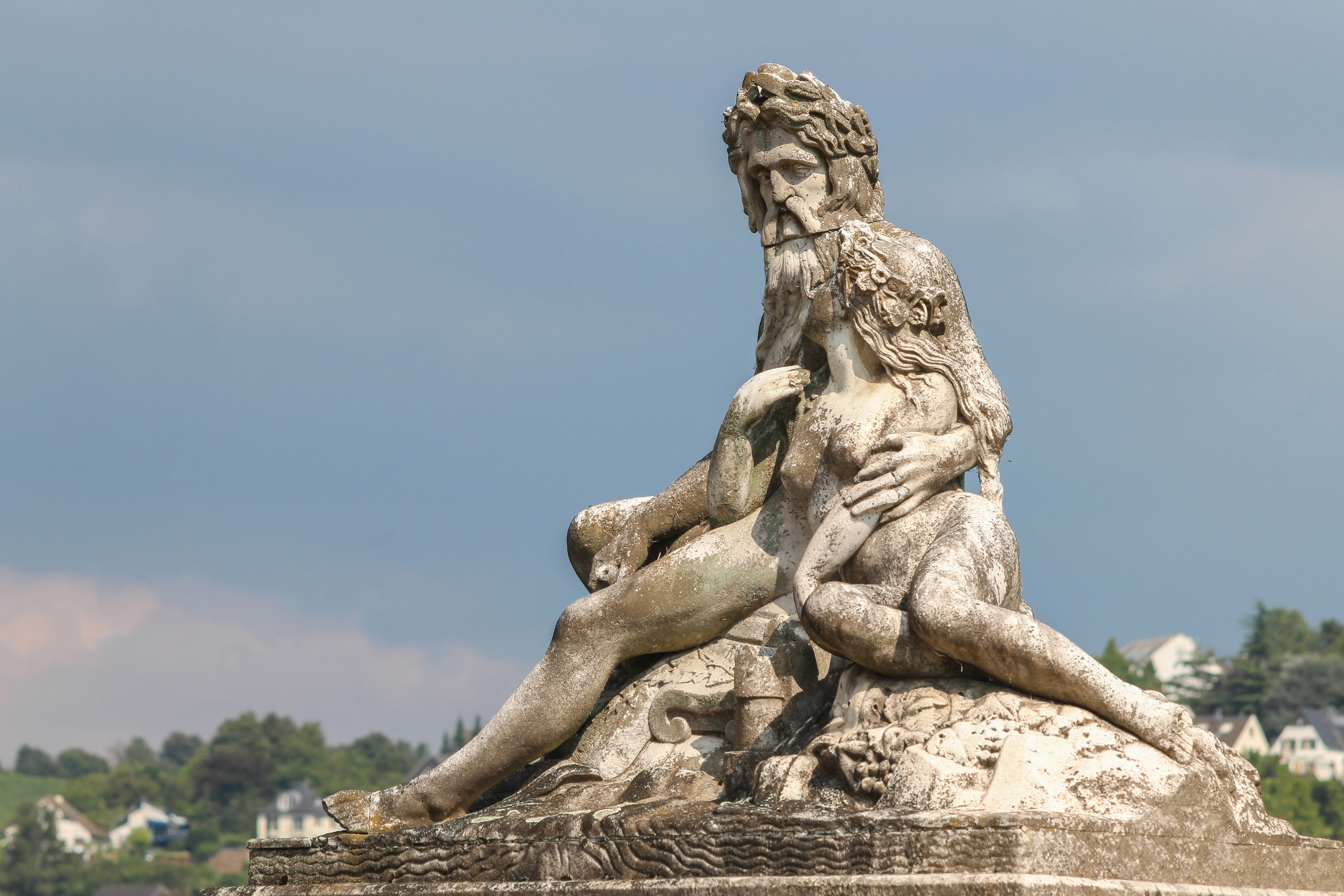
Sculpture Father Rhine and Mother Mosel.

In the garden behind the palace is an 1854 sandstone sculpture by Johann Hartung depicting the allegorical figures Father Rhine and Mother Mosel.

== History ==
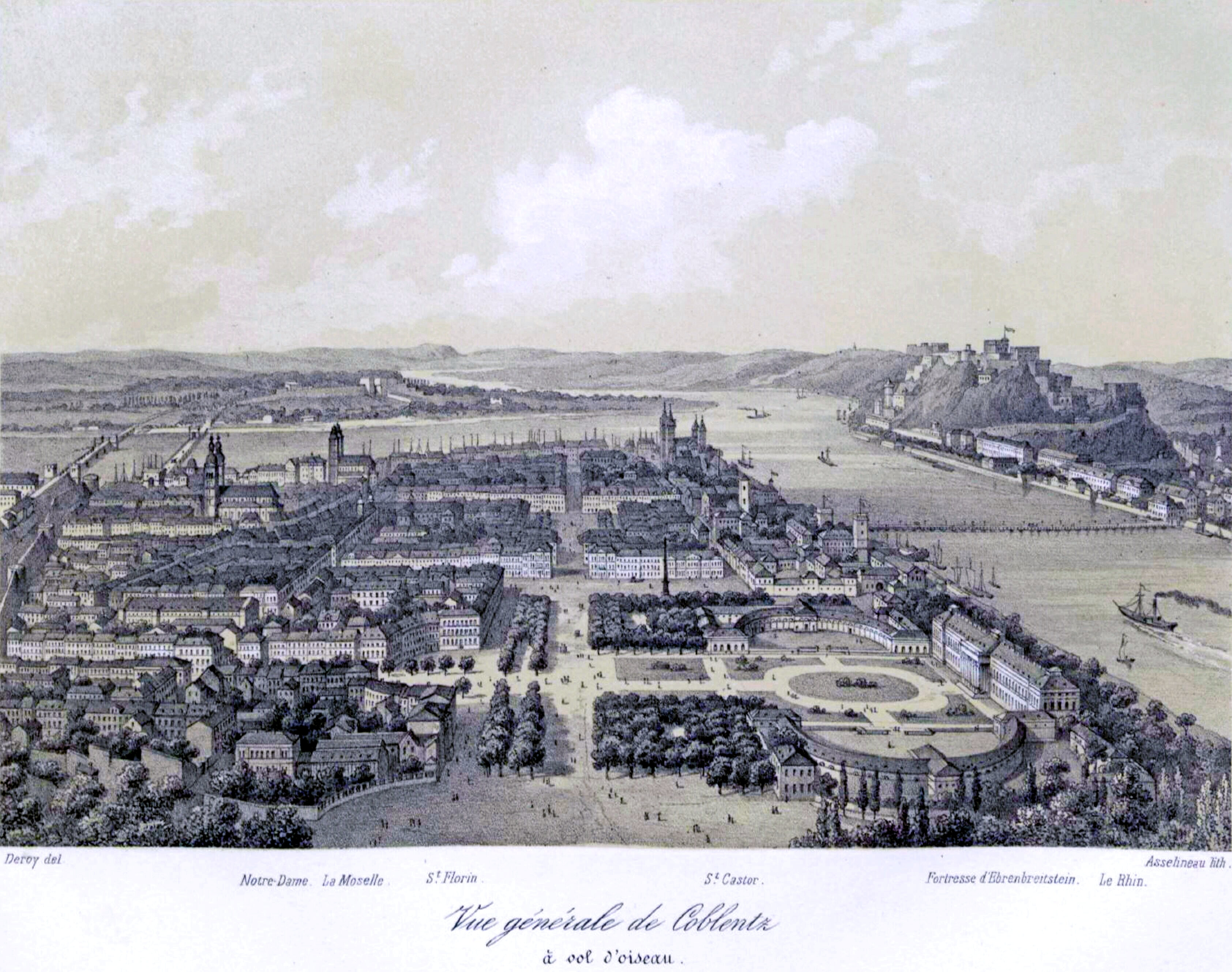
Aerial view of the palace, Koblenz and the Rhine, second half of the 19th century

=== Construction ===
The old electoral residence, Schloss Philippsburg in Ehrenbreitstein, was in urgent need of repair and from the point of view of the new archbishop and elector, a member of the Saxon-Polish royal family, was beneath his station. The estates, who did not readily accept the need for a new building, were only persuaded after lengthy discussion to agree to paying for it. The building was finally erected in 1777–1793 in a new section of Koblenz called Neustadt. The original chief architect was the Parisian Pierre Michel d’Ixnard, who had already designed several buildings in South Germany. A first draft of the plans made in 1776, by others had been for a horseshoe-shaped design farther away from the river and farther north, facing the old city centre; probably on the request of Clemens Wenceslaus, d'Ixnard changed the site and the orientation. However, after criticism of his plans, a report was commissioned from the Academy of Architects in Paris, which confirmed some of the criticism. He was let go on 18 December 1779 and was replaced on the Academy's recommendation by another French architect, Antoine-François Peyre the Younger, whose modified plans submitted in 1780 produced the smaller and simpler structure which was built. The exterior was complete by 1784.

Until 1787, the interiors and furniture were overseen by François Ignace Mangin and were executed primarily by court stucco master Henckel and the Mainz court sculptor Johann Sebastian Pfaff. Januarius Zick was responsible for ceiling frescoes. Construction supervisors included Johann Andreas Gärtner of Dresden, the architect of the Festungsschirrhof in Koblenz (damaged in the Second World War and later demolished; now the site of the Reichenspergerplatz) and father of the Munich architect Friedrich von Gärtner, who was born in Koblenz.

On 23 November 1786, Clemens Wenceslaus and his sister Maria Kunigunde of Saxony, Princess-Abbess of Essen, moved into the new palace. A year later, the new theatre was opened not far away. The banqueting hall and palace chapel were completed only later, the latter in 1792. Clemens Wenceslaus was at first open to reforms, but after the French Revolution broke out, in alarm cancelled all reforms and instituted strict rule. He was the uncle of the French king, Louis XVI; he offered refuge to French émigrés and fleeing members of the French court, particularly in Schönbornslust Palace, just outside the gates of Koblenz. Koblenz thus became a French Royalist centre.

=== French occupation ===
During the War of the First Coalition, the advance of the French revolutionary army finally made it necessary for Clemens Wenceslaus to flee on 7 October 1794. Two weeks later, the French under General François Séverin Marceau-Desgraviers captured Koblenz. The Electorate of Trier ceased to exist and at the end of 1801 was largely annexed by France. It was therefore impossible to complete the interior of the Electoral Palace. Before leaving, Clemens Wenceslaus had what could be moved loaded on ships and taken to Augsburg, where the pieces became part of the furnishings of the electoral residence there. Some were auctioned off after his death; large parts of the furnishings of the reception rooms from the palace at Koblenz remain in Schloss Johannisburg in Aschaffenburg, in Nymphenburg Palace in Munich, in the Munich Residenz, in the Landshut Residence, and in the New Residence in Bamberg.

After Clemens Wenceslaus' departure, the palace was used temporarily as a military hospital (a Russian military hospital after Napoleon withdrew from Moscow and the Russians liberated Koblenz from the French) and, beginning in 1815 after it passed into the possession of Prussia, as a barracks.

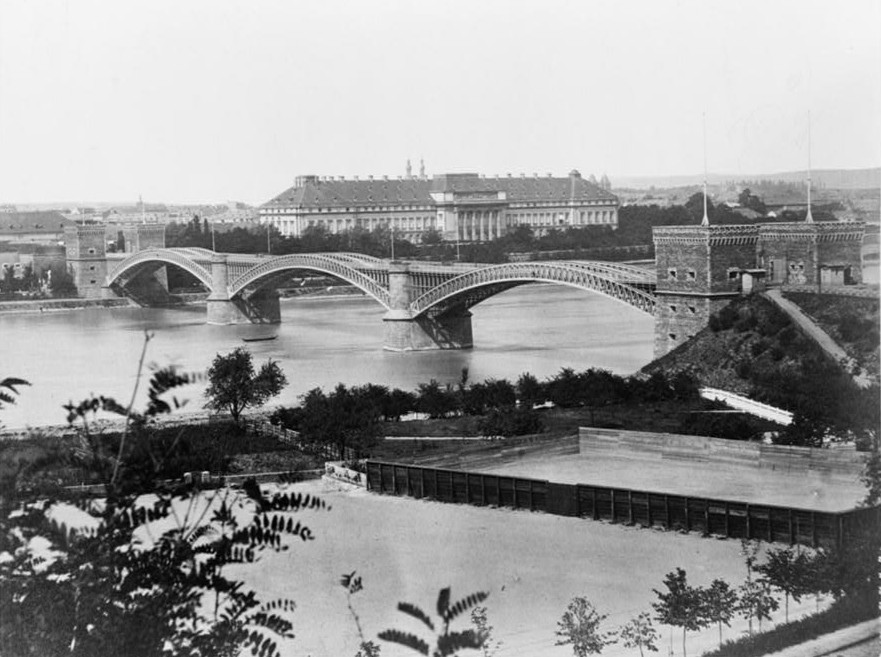
Rhine frontage of the palace photographed in the 1890s (in the foreground, Pfaffendorf railway bridge)

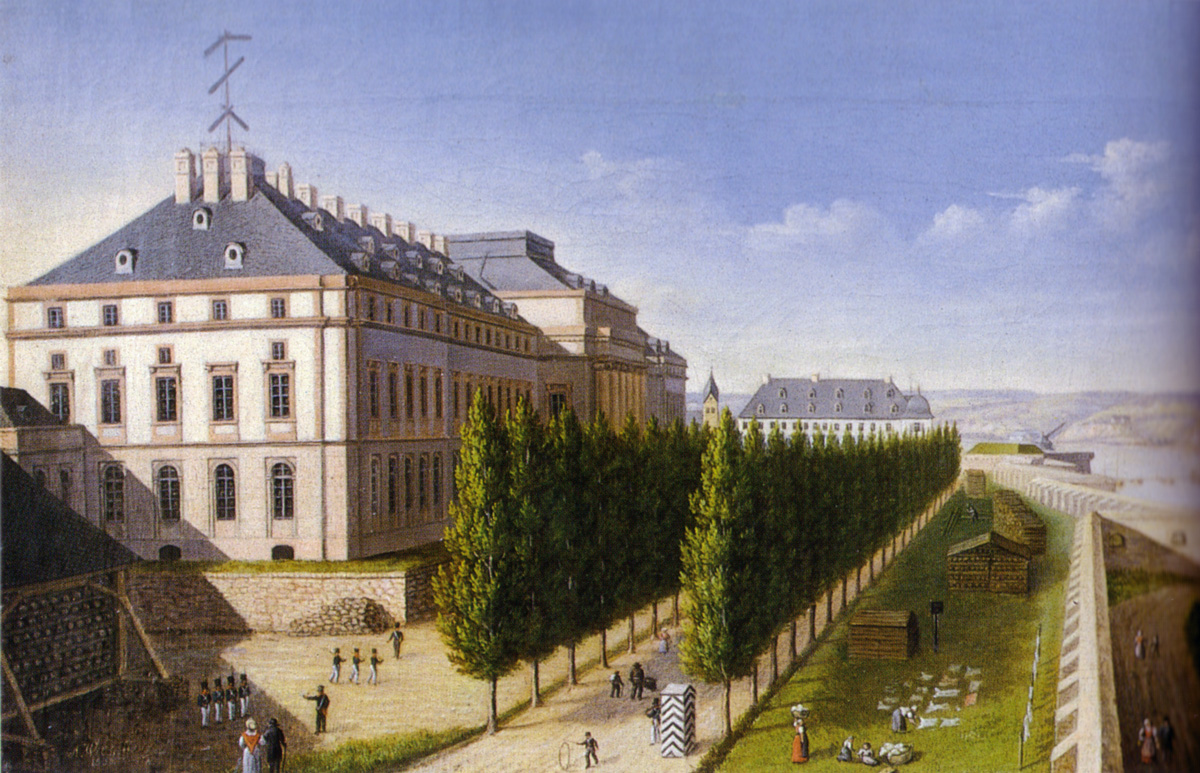
Prussian semaphore installation on the roof of one wing in a mid-19th-century painting

=== Prussian rule ===
From 1823 to 1842, the Electoral Palace was the seat of various government offices and law courts of the Prussian Rhine Province. The ground floor was the seat of the Oberpräsident, the provincial governor, from 1846 to 1911, when he moved into a specially constructed building next to the palace. The guard headquarters for the city of Koblenz was housed until 1918 at the head end of the southern semi-circular wing.

Between 1842 and 1845, the interior was redesigned by Johann Claudius von Lassaulx to designs by Friedrich August Stüler, because the palace had been designated the official residence for members of the Prussian royal family visiting the Rhineland; the royal accommodations were on the first floor.

From 1833 to 1852, the belvedere of the southern wing was surmounted by an apparatus constituting one terminus (station 61) of the Prussian semaphore line between Berlin, Cologne and Koblenz. The transmitting office and the office overseeing the western sections of the line were both housed in the palace.

From 1850 to 1858, Prince Wilhelm, later Wilhelm I, resided in the palace with his wife Augusta while serving as military governor of the Rhine Province and the Province of Westphalia. The first section of the Rhine promenade, designed by Peter Joseph Lenné and later named the Kaiserin Augusta Anlagen after her, was created at her urging. Until a few weeks before her death in January 1890, she continued to pay annual visits to the palace and the city of Koblenz, her "Rhenish Potsdam".

=== Twentieth century ===
Until the outbreak of World War I in 1914, the palace continued to be frequently visited by members of the Prussian royal, then imperial family. For two weeks that August, it then served as Wilhelm II's base of operations and the location of the Imperial German General Headquarters. After the war, it housed various government offices until 1923, when it was the site of the proclamation of the separatist Rhenish Republic under Minister-President-designate Josef Friedrich Matthes which lasted until 9 February 1924.

During the Nazi era, an amphitheatrical Thingplatz theatre was created in the palace forecourt. It was one of the first of a projected 400 to be built; in March 1934 building materials were brought up from the Rhine by citizens, over 100 workers began work in two shifts on 8 June, a mystical cornerstone-laying ceremony took place on 16 June, and the theatre was dedicated by Mayor Otto Wittgen on 24 March 1935. The theatre was oval, 100 metres (330 ft) long by 70 metres (230 ft) wide and approximately 5 metres (16 ft) deep; it was constructed using 16,000 basalt pillars, seated 20,000 people and could accommodate a further 80,000 standees in the surrounding areas of the forecourt. The layout incorporated a glacial boulder and, under the palace portico, a memorial grotto with an eternal flame. The motto of the theatre was Leuchte, scheine goldene Sonne über dies befreite Land (Gleam, shine golden sun, over this liberated land), and a lur was installed on the palace roof, to be sounded twice daily. It was audible up to 5 kilometres (3.1 mi) away. The Koblenz Thingplatz was one of the most important in the effort to use the locations for mystical observances, particularly at the summer solstice. However, interest in the Thingspiel movement waned rapidly, and already at the end of 1937 a contest was organised to redesign the forecourt as a simple parade ground, doing away with the amphitheatre; in later years it was mainly used for the annual May Day ceremonies. After World War II, it was filled in with debris from the bombing of the city.

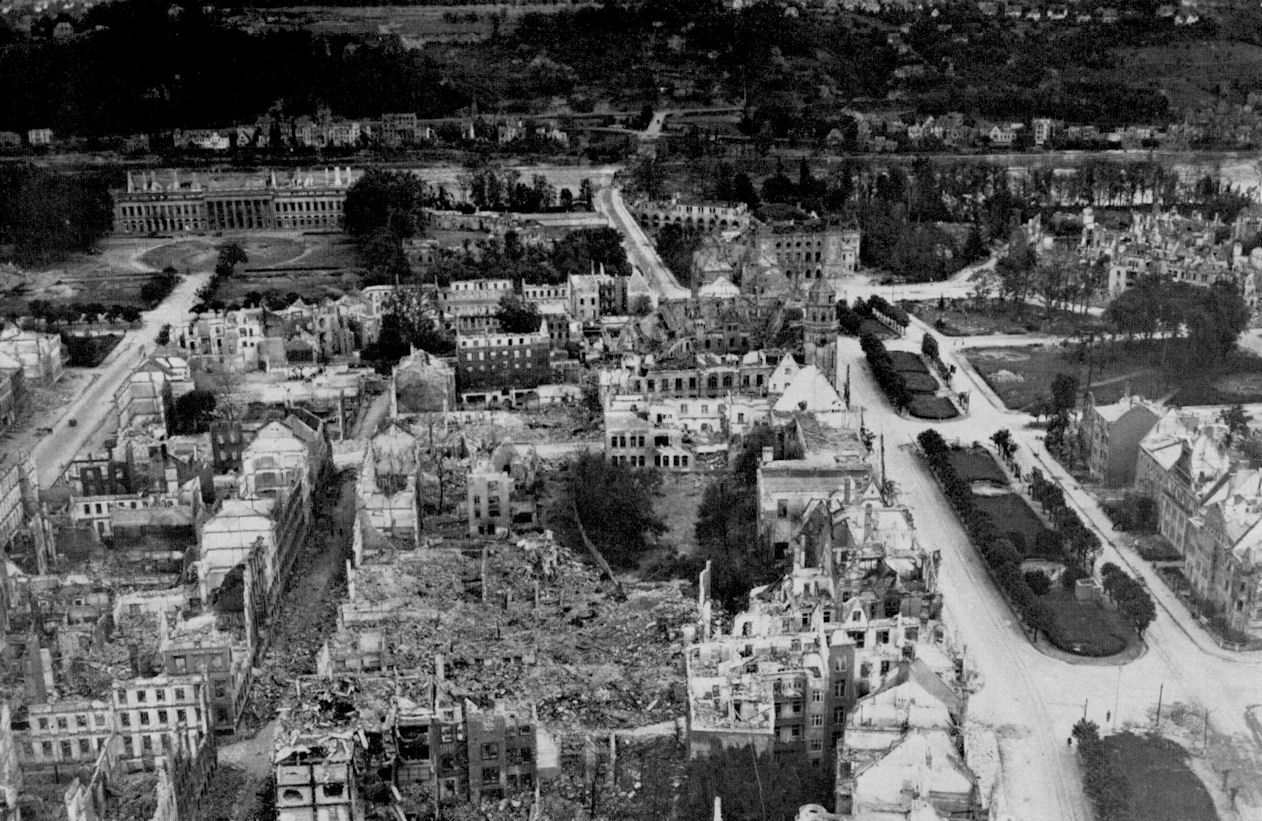
Ruins of Koblenz in 1945, the burned out Electoral Palace at top left

During World War II, the palace complex was reduced to a shell by bombs in 1944. It was rebuilt in 1950–51, the exterior being accurately reconstructed using the original plans and the interior finished in 1950s style, except for a few spaces in the centre section whose interiors were reconstructed in the classical style of the palace's original construction (before Stüler's alterations): the grand staircase, the entrance hall, the guard room (now known as the Spiegelsaal (hall of mirrors) or the Kurfürstensaal (elector's hall) and the garden room. A competition was held to choose art works for these rooms: the staircase was decorated on the ground floor with a statue by Emil Krieger entitled Kore, on the landings with Europa on the Bull by Otto Rumpf and Horse and Rider by Werner Meurer and on the first floor with niche paintings by Edvard Frank; Rolf Müller-Landau created allegorical paintings for the niches in the south hall on the ground floor; two paintings in the northern vestibule of the garden room are by Edgar Ehse; and a mosaic on one wall of the grand staircase, signed E. K., is probably by Eugen Keller. The selection committee attempted to reproduce as closely as possible the original impression a visitor would have received, including in the choice of colours, but the works reflect the period of their creation. The grounds were restored in the original style, in particular the forecourt. The only surviving historic interior is that of the vestibule to the now destroyed palace chapel, at the head end of the northern semi-circular wing. The two wings were restored in a simplified modern form, preserving only the footprint of the originals.

The building initially served as the seat of the Allied Security Office (Military Security Board). In 1960 the building was sold to the Federal Republic of Germany by the State of Rhineland-Palatinate, which had inherited it in 1946 as the legal successor to Prussia. In 1998 it was again restored, and the exterior, which had been painted in the traditional ochre and purplish red of Prussian forts and palaces, was repainted in its 18th-century colour scheme: pale grey walls and grey architectural details. The palace currently houses offices for various branches of the federal government (including the Institute for Federal Real Estate (Bundesanstalt für Immobilienaufgaben), which also oversees the building, the Central Tariffs Office (Hauptzollamt), the Bundeswehr Office for Armaments, Information Technology and Implementation (Bundesamt für Ausrüstung, Informationstechnik und Nutzung der Bundeswehr) and the Federal Testing Agency (Prüfungsamt des Bundes), a division of the Bundesrechnungshof, the national auditing agency. It is therefore not accessible to the public except during special events.

In October 2008, during excavation for an underground carpark in front of the palace, an early Roman craftsmen's settlement was uncovered. A set of steps 100 metres (330 ft) wide intended to provide seating was created on the river bank behind the palace in 2009.

Twentieth-century views of the Electoral Palace

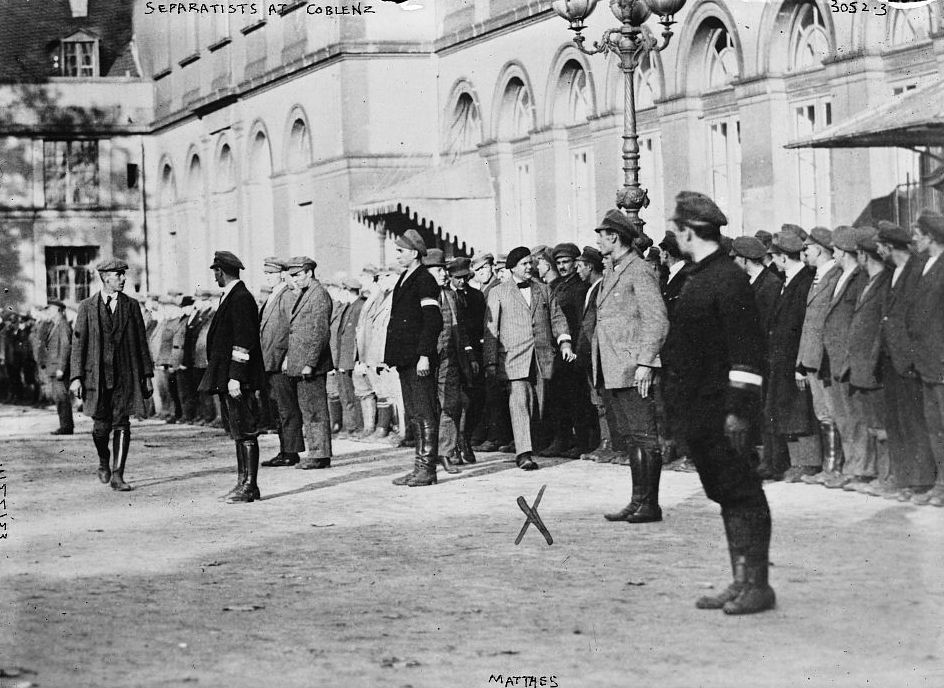
Separatists of the Rhenish Republic in front of the palace in November 1923

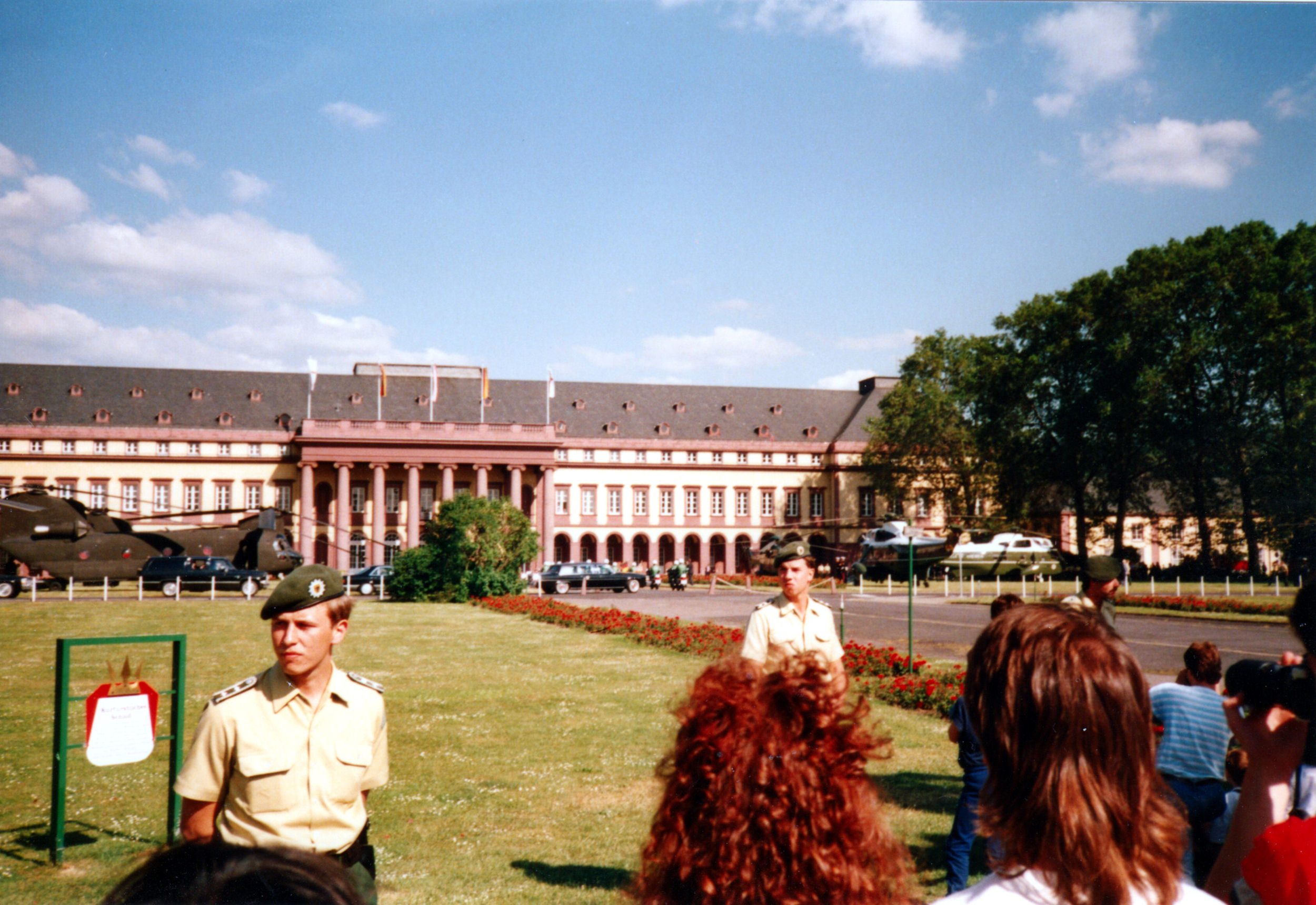
U. S. President George H. W. Bush's motorcade in front of the palace in 1989, the building then still painted ochre and purplish red

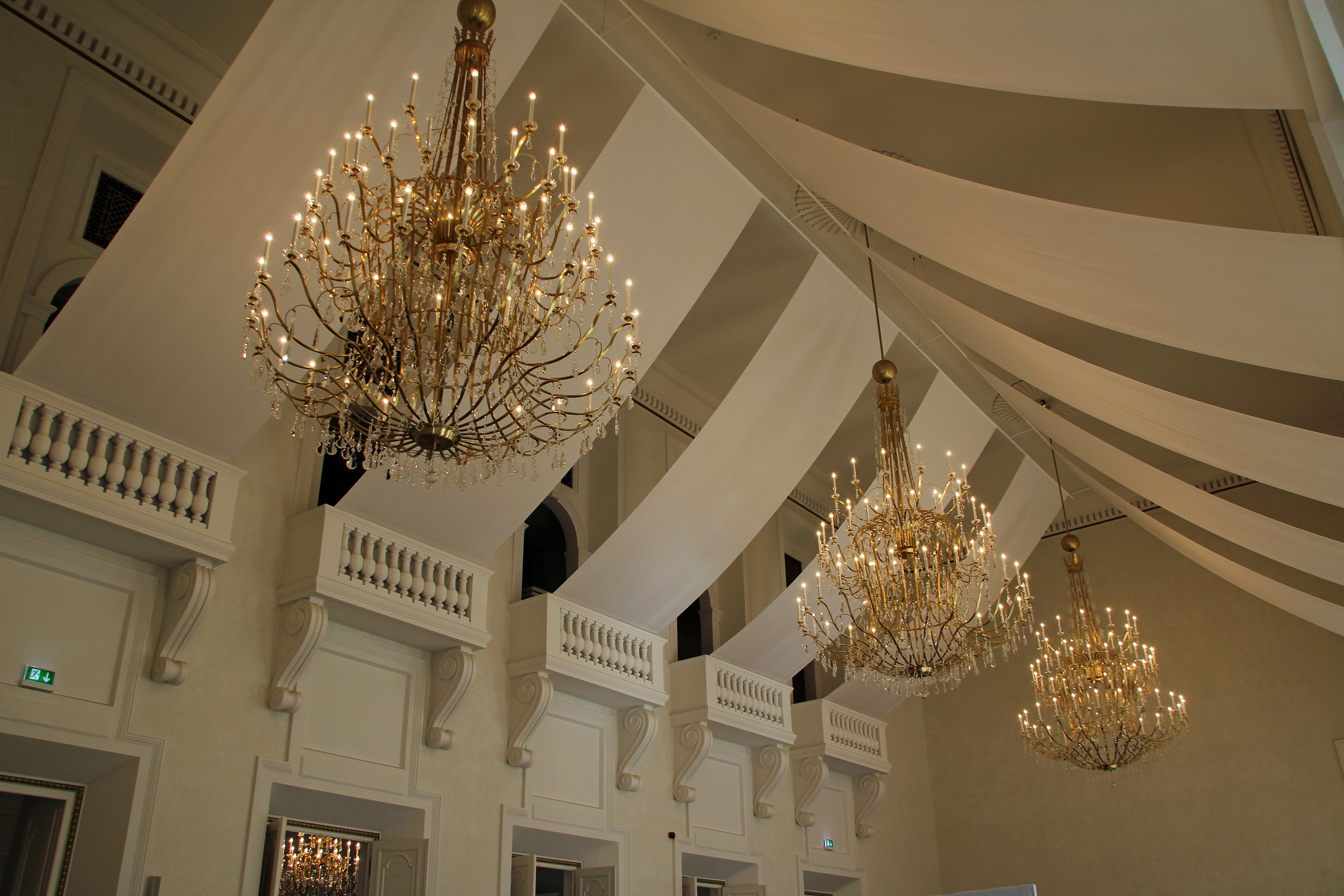
Kaisersaal

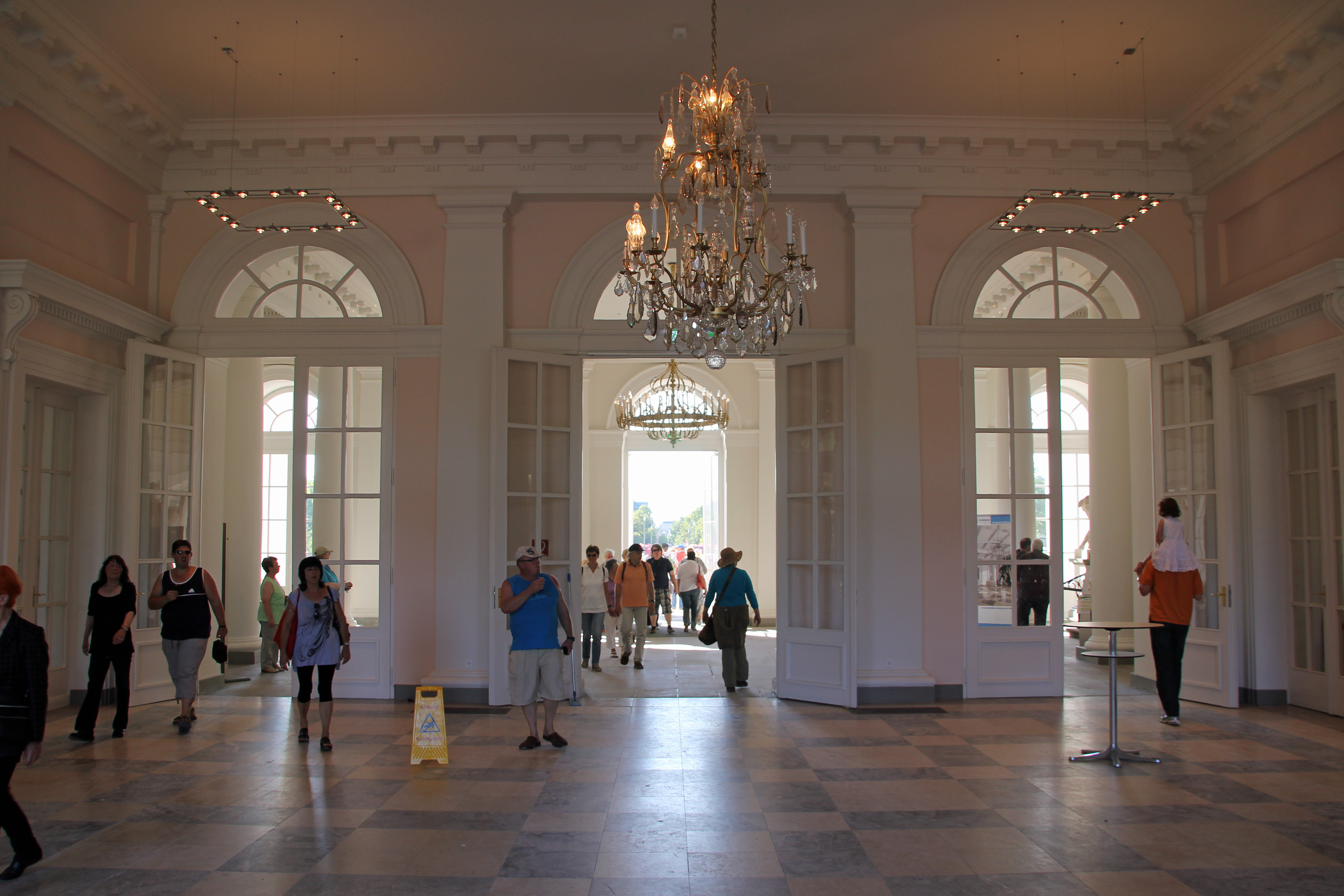
Visitors in the restored vestibule of the palace during the 2011 Federal Horticultural Show

=== 2011 Federal Horticultural Show ===
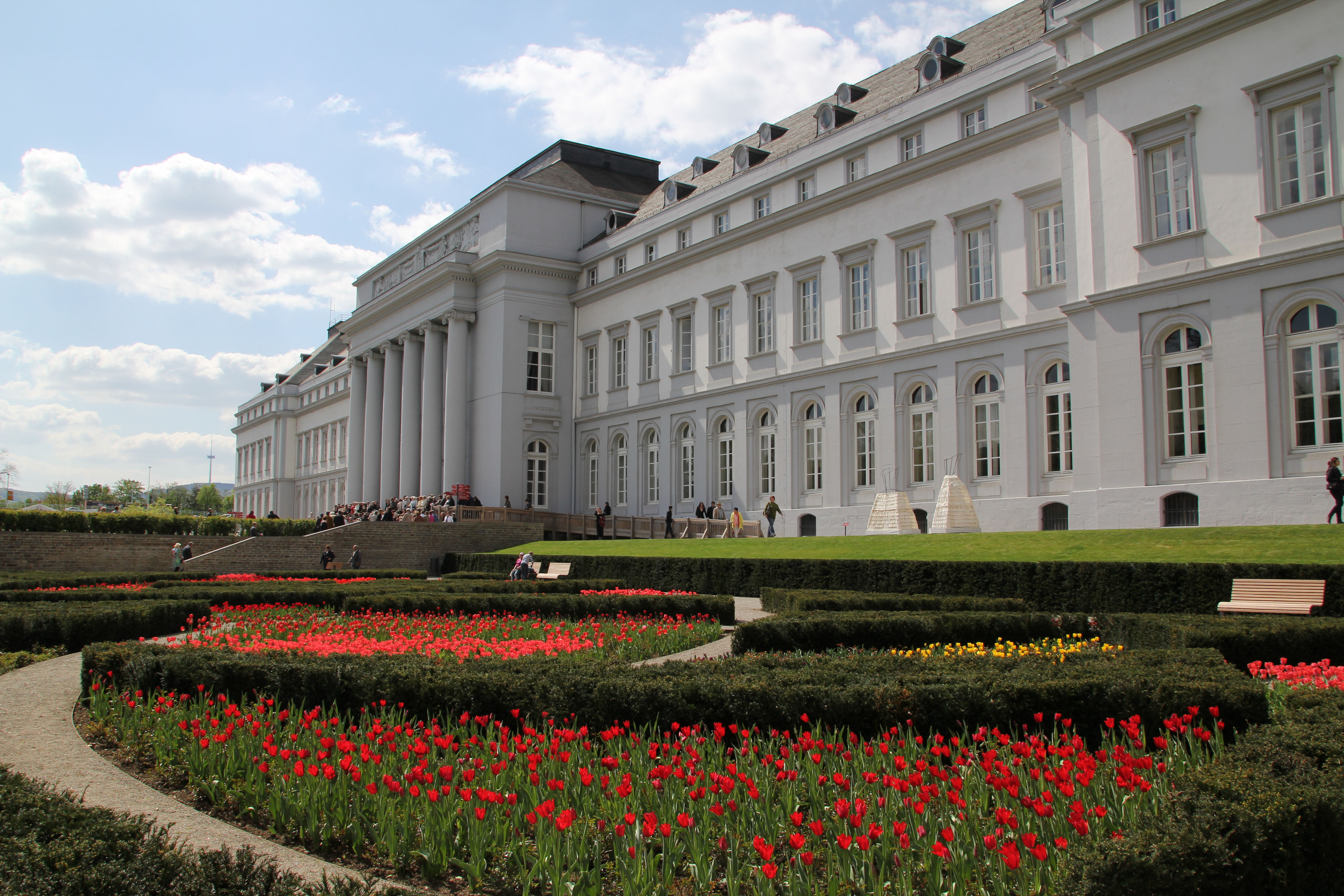
The Electoral Palace during the 2011 Federal Horticultural Show at Koblenz

The city of Koblenz won the contract to host the 2011 German Federal Horticultural Show, and the area around the palace was used as one of the exhibition areas. The palace was opened up to provide a direct route by way of the Schlossstraße from the new central Koblenz railway station to the bank of the Rhine. The entire area was laid out with many different kinds of flowers, pools, fountains, radiating terraces and walls for seating, reflecting the splendour in which rulers formerly lived in the palace. The garden behind the palace was restored to a historically appropriate appearance based on designs by Lenné, using terraces stepping down to the river.

The Koblenz Lichtströme (lightstreams) lighting festival which began in association with the 2011 Horticultural Show featured the Electoral Palace in 2012. The Casa Magica artists' group projected a light show based on magnetic resonance imaging onto the facade.

== See also ==
Other palaces, residences and hunting lodges of the Prince-Electors of Trier:

- Electoral Palace, Trier
- The yellow castle of Montabaur
- Schloss Engers
- Schloss Kärlich
- Schloss Philippsburg (Koblenz)
- Schloss Philippsfreude
- Schloss Schönbornslust
