= Bundesgartenschau 2011 =

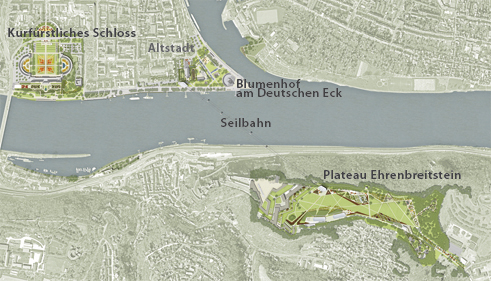
Plan of the sites of the Federal Garden Show

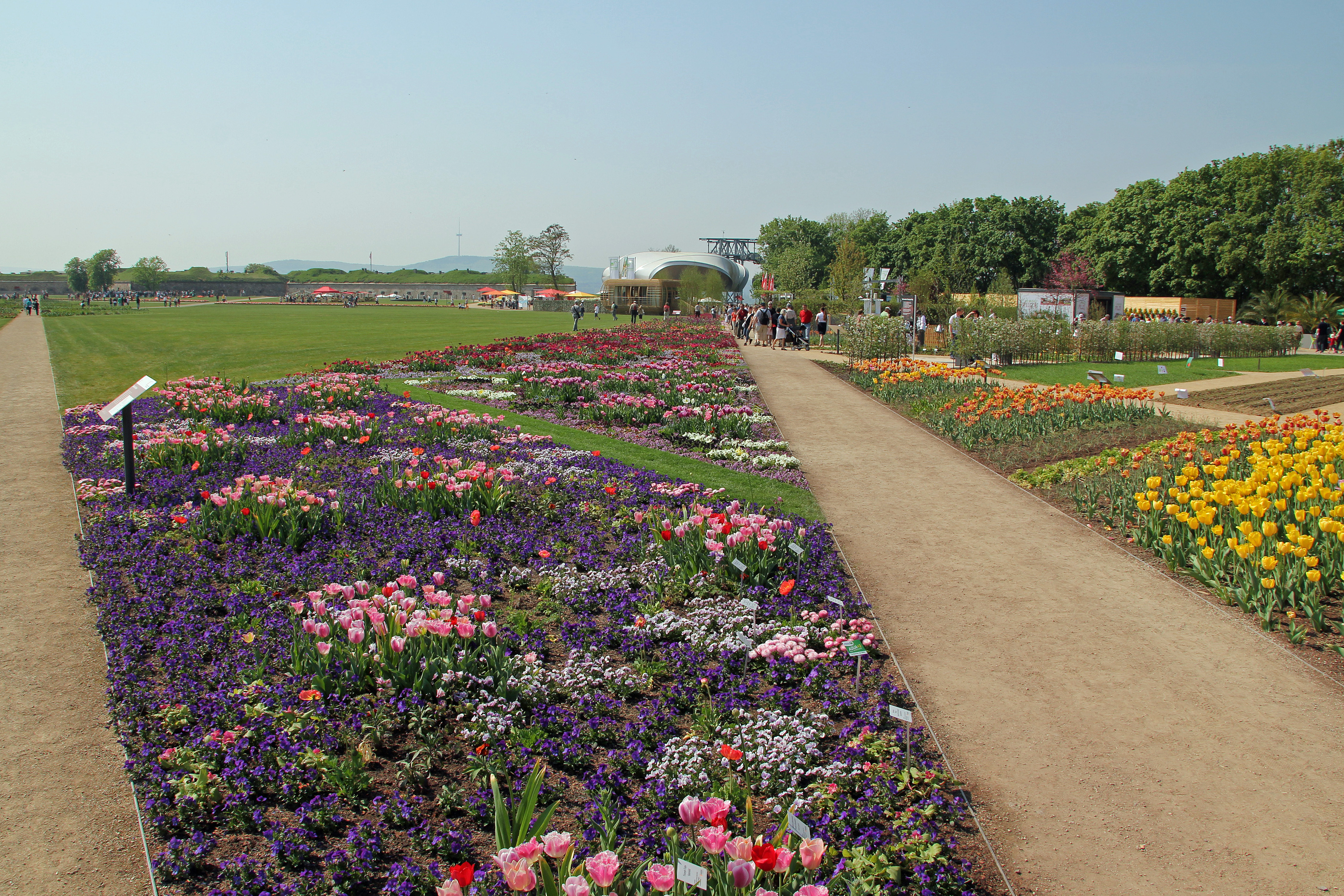
Park at Ehrenbreitstein

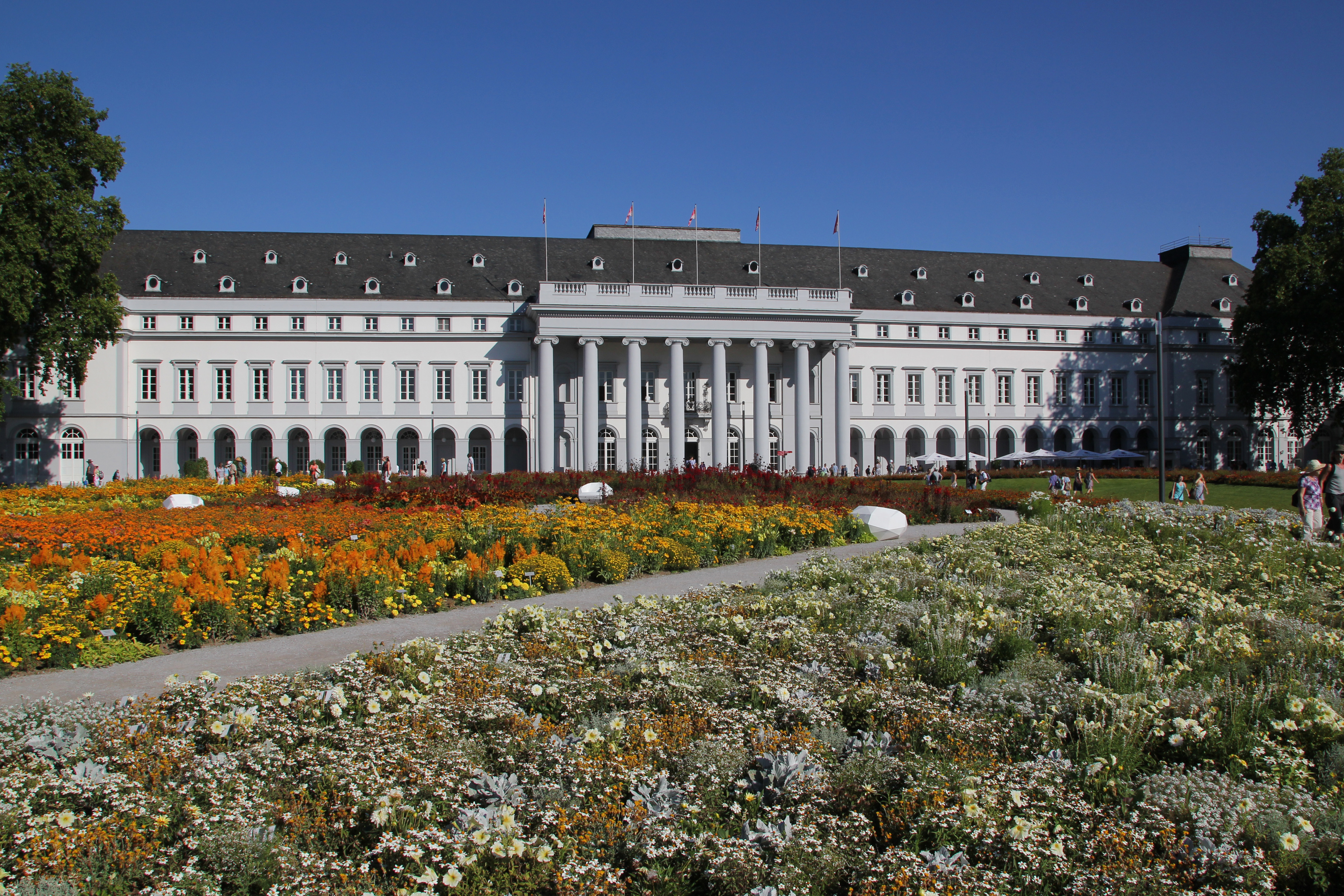
Electoral Palace

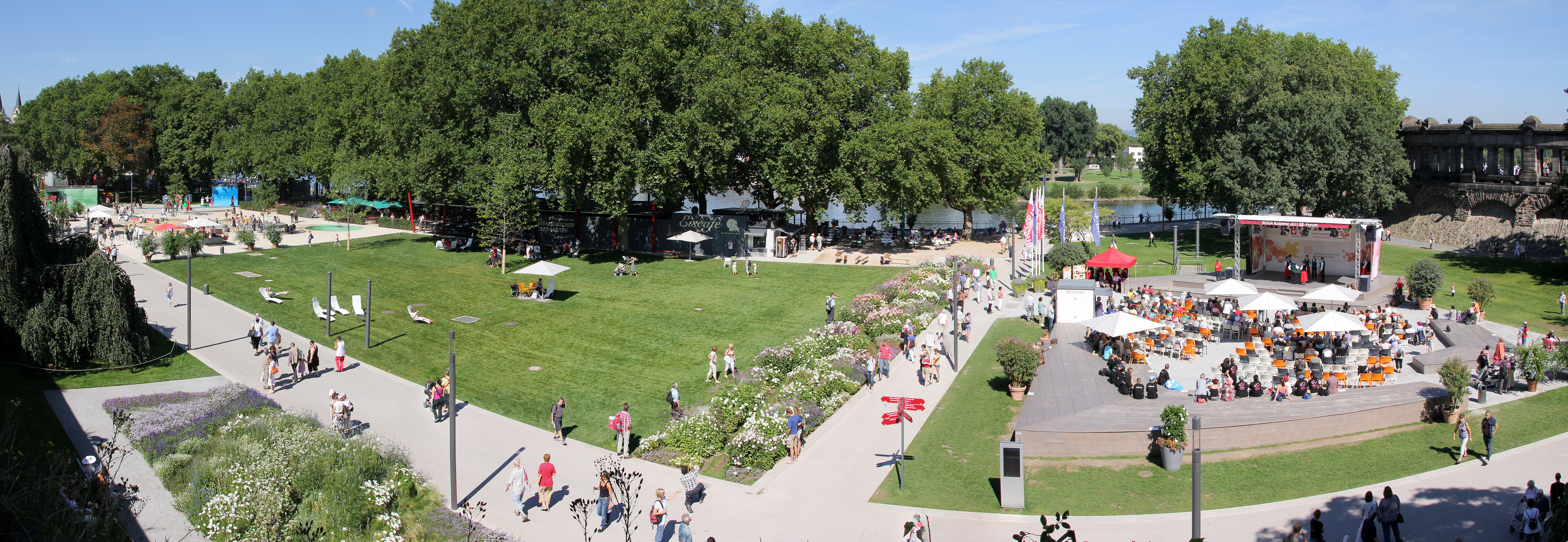
Blumenhof at Deutsches Eck

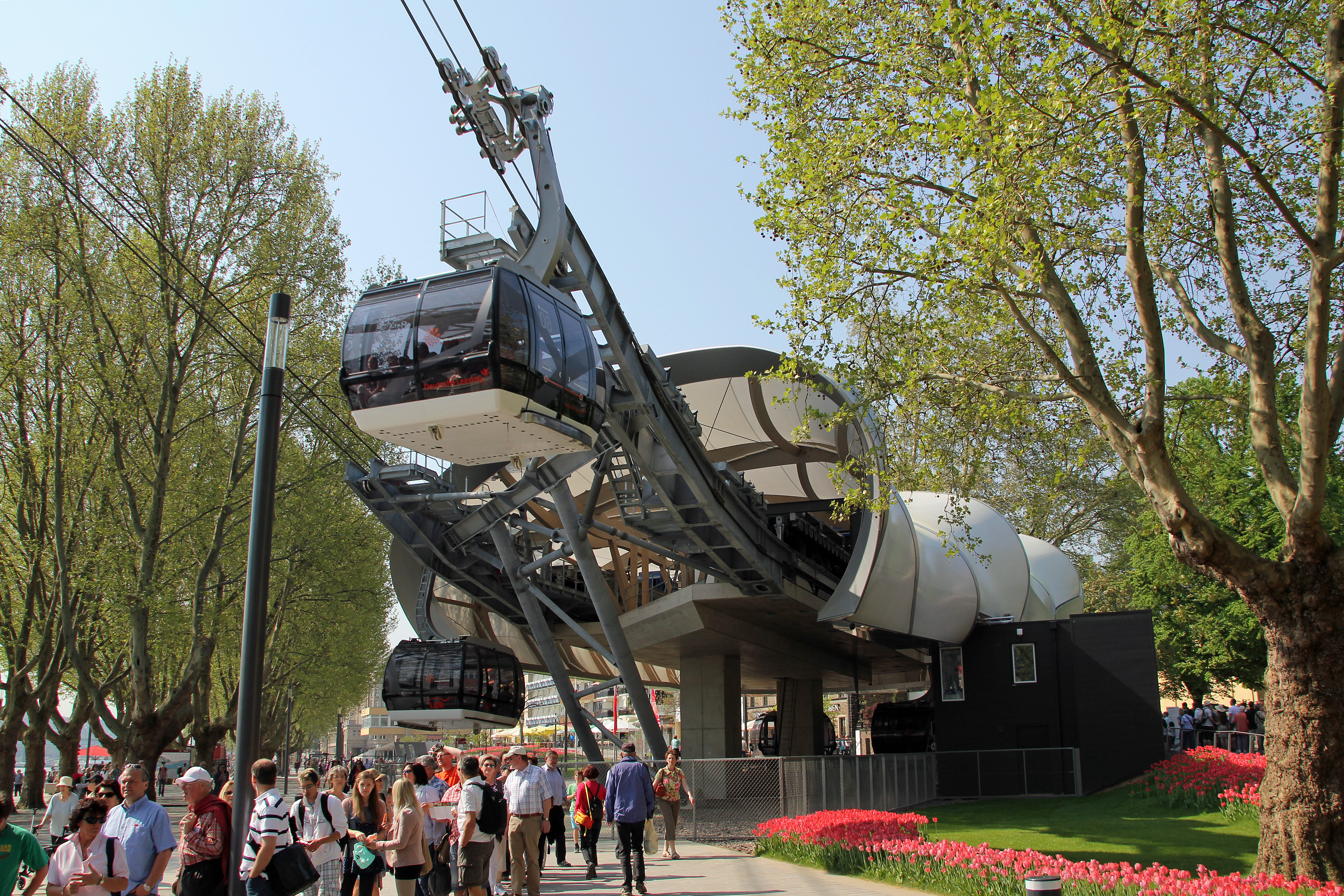
Koblenz Cable Car

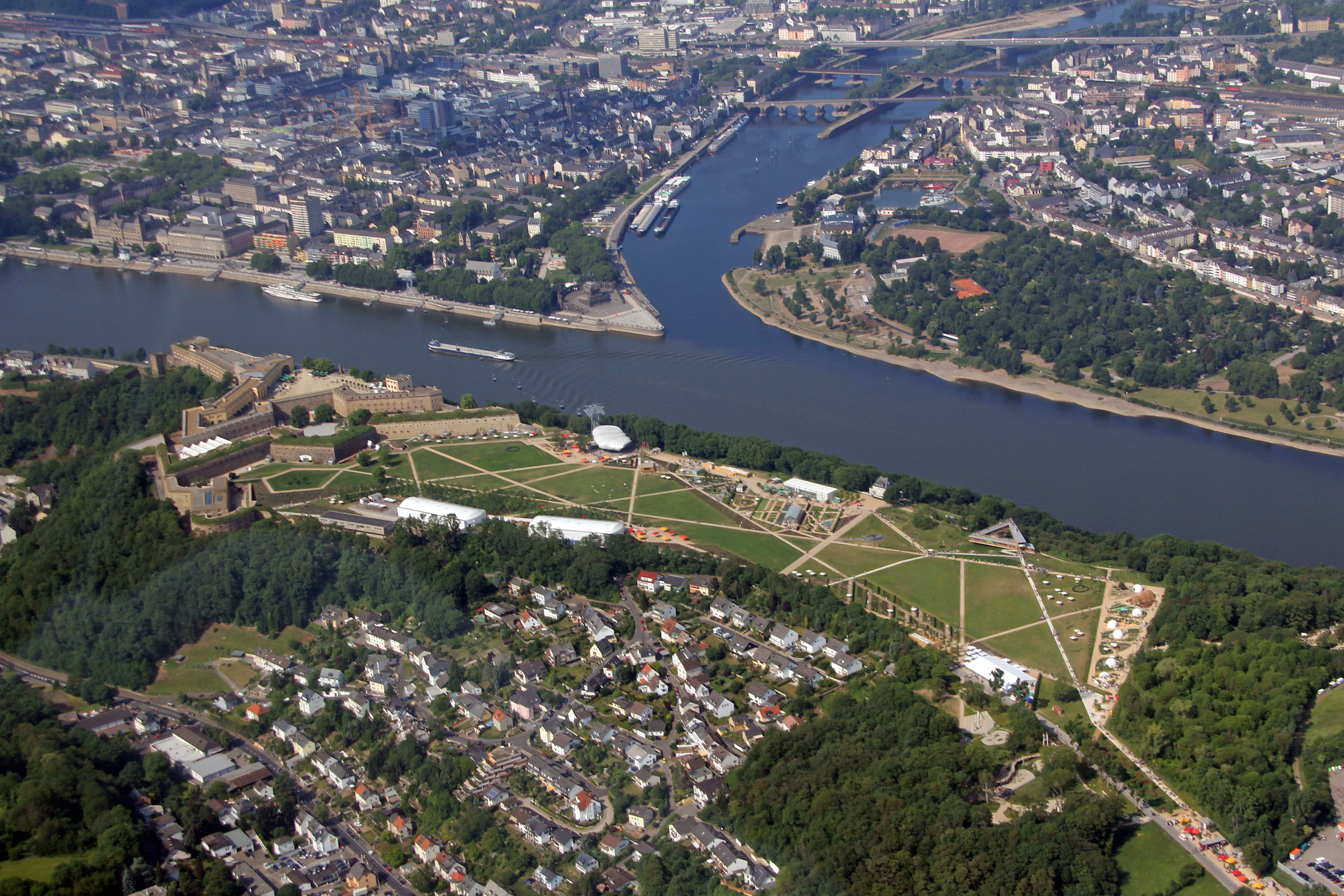
Aerial view of core area Ehrenbreitstein

The Federal Horticultural Show 2011 (German: Bundesgartenschau 2011) was held from 15 April to 16 October 2011 in Koblenz, Germany. It was the first Federal Horticultural Show in the state of Rhineland-Palatinate. Venues had been the plateau in front of the Ehrenbreitstein Fortress, the square in front of the Electoral Palace and flower beds in the area around the Deutsches Eck. One of its attractions was the cable car over the Rhine, which was established as an ecologically sound transport connection. It connects the Rhine shores near the Basilica of St. Kastor with the plateau in front of the fortress. Unlike previous garden shows, the staging area in Koblenz was mainly in the centre of the city and directly affected the local population. In addition to the prestige of hosting a Federal Horticultural Show, Koblenz benefited to a much greater extent from the associated urban development.

== Planning and funding ==
In 2001/2002, Koblenz applied to be a venue for a Federal Horticultural Show in 2013 or 2015. Duisburg had been awarded the show for 2011, but it withdrew from its commitment. In January 2004, the National Gardening Association (Zentralverband Gartenbau, ZVG) awarded the 2011 event to Koblenz. After discussions with the state of Rhineland-Palatinate on the financing of the project, the City Council made a final commitment on 27 January 2005 to host the Federal Garden Show in 2011.

The total budget had been expected to amount to € 102 million, of which € 49 million had been provided by the state and € 28 million by the city of Koblenz. The rest of the funds were to be raised from sponsorship and from the entry fees of the expected attendance of at least two million visitors. By the summer of 2007, ideas had been sought and a preliminary plan had been completed. The ground breaking ceremony was celebrated in the city at the Electoral Palace on 20 July 2008, 999 days before the start of the National Garden Festival.

== Logo and slogan ==
The Logo of the Federal Horticultural Show 2011 presents a colourful kaleidoscope in the form of a twist, which is intended to represent intense viewing. It is meant to symbolise the city’s energy in its preparations for the Federal Horticultural Show, as well as referring to the playful elements of a happy and colourful festival. The garden show’s slogan is "Koblenz transformed".

== Core areas ==
There were three core areas for the Federal Horticultural Show 2011: In the inner city there was the area around the Electoral Palace, there had been flower beds at the Deutsches Eck, and on the right (eastern) bank there was the area located on the plateau of Ehrenbreitstein. These core areas had been fenced and were only accessible with a ticket.

The largest area of 27 hectares was located on the plateau in front of Ehrenbreitstein fortress. This was a large landscape garden and formed the entrance to the fortress. Historically this forecourt allowed a "free field of fire", which was needed to defend the fortress at that time. The main axis runs from the top station of the cable car to the entrance of Ehrenbreitstein fortress as a diagonal through the garden on the plateau. In this field, there was a forest of orchids, abandoned vineyards, an arid biotope, old orchards and gardens, rare species of bats and habitats for endangered species at the edges of the slope.

The grounds around the Electoral Palace has an area of 8.6 hectares. It is the largest palace complex in the Middle Rhine area and its garden is integrated into the city. There is a restaurant in the castle. The garden behind the palace was restored to the historical Lenné scheme. The entire complex had been made up of diverse species of plants, water features, fountains, radial steps and walls for sitting on. It reflects the glory of the rulers who once resided here.

The flower beds on the Deutsches Eck had been the smallest area with 2.2 hectares. They had been located behind the Deutsches Eck between Deutschherrenhaus and St. Kastor’s church. It was intended as a peaceful area for the enjoyment of secular and religious art. Art exhibitions and cultural events with sculptures and flower beds dominated this area, which was divided into three approximately equal-sized fields. In 2008, preparation of this site found the first archaeological evidence for a Roman settlement at Koblenz, following 150 years of fruitless searches.

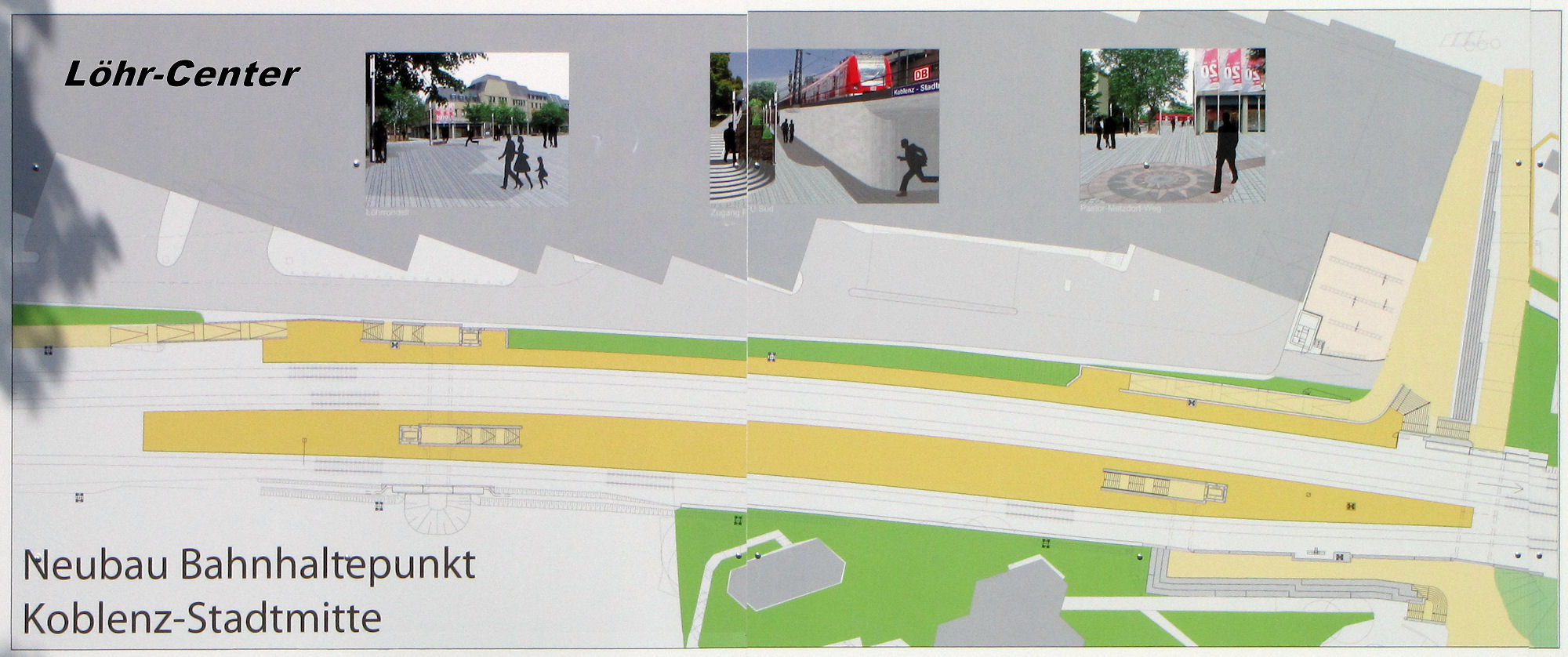
Plan of Koblenz-Stadtmitte station
