= Adolf Schinnerer =

German artist

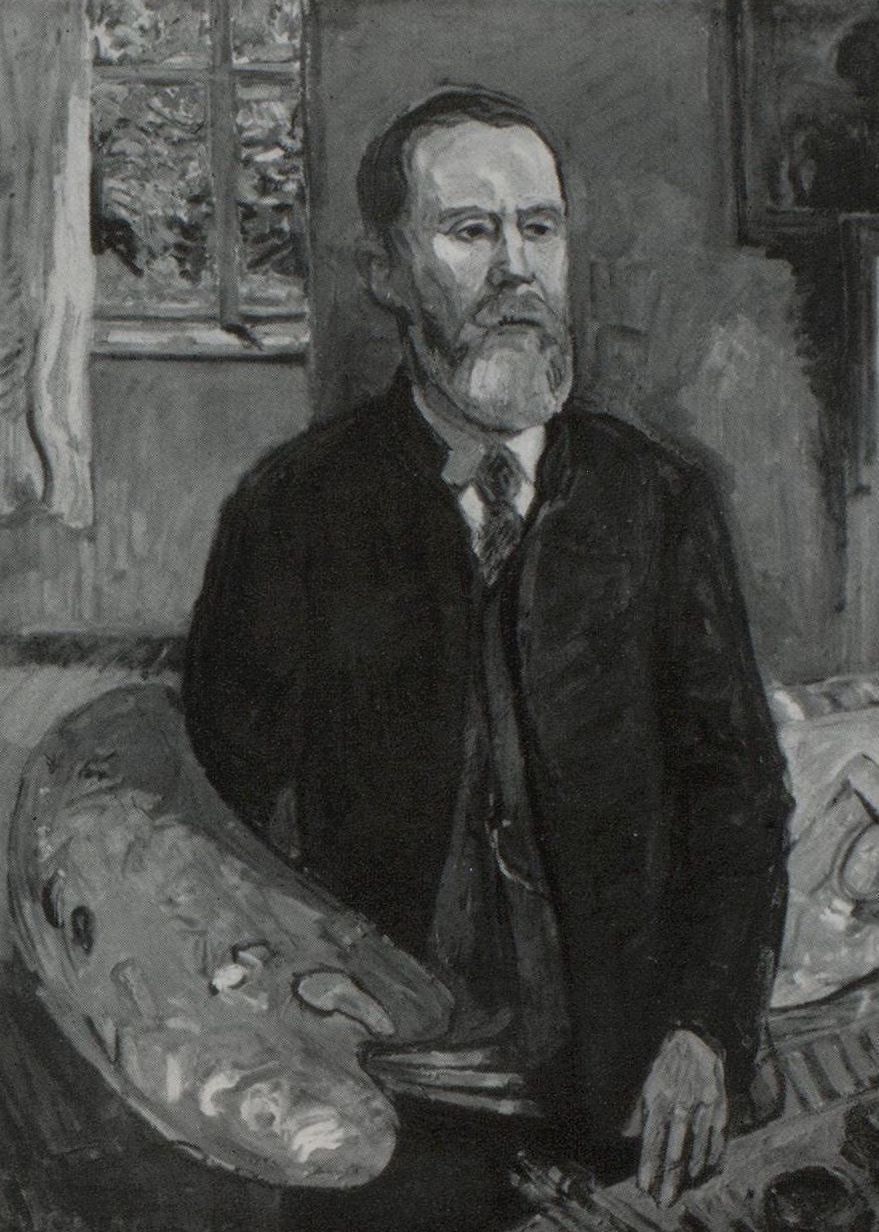
Self-portrait, 1935

Adolf Ferdinand Schinnerer (25 September 1876, Schwarzenbach – 30 January 1949, Ottershausen, part of Haimhausen) was a German artist and educator, active in painting, drawing and printmaking. He was part of the broad German Expressionist movement.

In 1909 he was one of three winners of the recently-established German Villa Romana Prize, allowing a year of residence in a villa near Florence, Italy.

From 1920 he was an instructor at the Academy of Fine Arts, Munich, where his students included Karl Gatermann the Younger, Juergen von Huendeberg and Emil Krieger.

In 1920 his lithograph Das Gastmahl ("The Banquet") was included in a print portfolio volume called Deutsche Graphiker der Gegenwart ("German Printmakers of Our Time", published by Klinkhardt & Biermann Verlag) with 15 lithographs, eight woodcuts, eight photomechanical reproductions, and one drypoint. The other artists were a very distinguished group, who would mostly later be accused of producing Degenerate art when the Nazis came to power. They were: Heinrich Campendonk, Oskar Kokoschka, Max Beckmann, Ludwig Meidner, Adolf Ferdinand Schinnerer, René Beeh, Karl Caspar, Max Unold, Conrad Felixmüller, Lyonel Feininger, Karl Schmidt-Rottluff, Max Pechstein, Otto Mueller, Erich Heckel, Richard Seewald, Christian Rohlfs, Ernst Barlach, George Grosz, Paul Klee, Emil Nolde, Alfred Kubin, Hans Meid, August Gaul, Max Slevogt, Käthe Kollwitz, Max Liebermann, Lovis Corinth, with the art historian Kurt Pfister as editor.

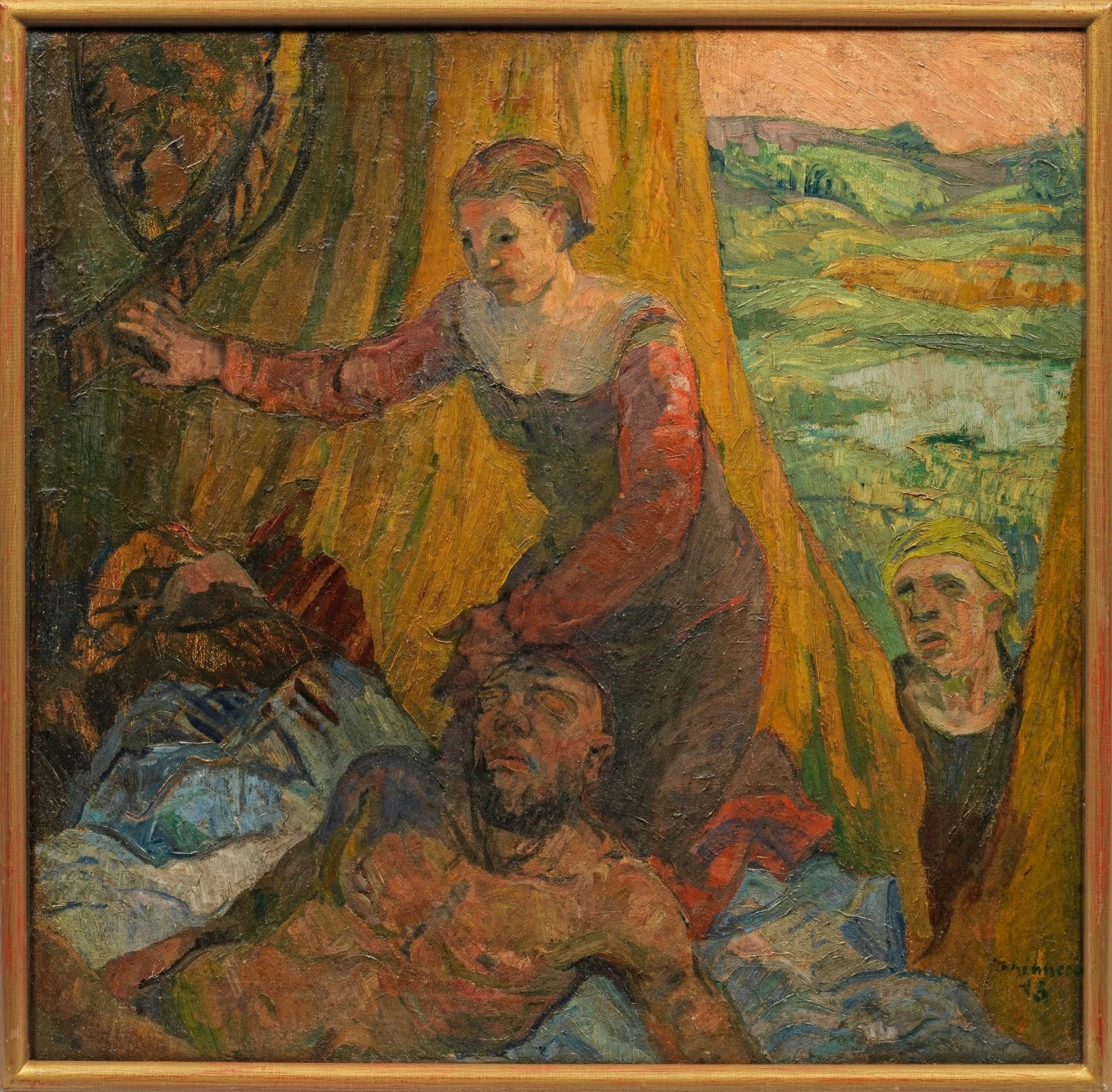
Samson and Delilah, 1918, oils

Several of his earlier works were confiscated from public collections as "degenerate art" from 1937, although he continued to teach and exhibit, and joined up with the Reichskammer der bildenden Künste (Reich Chamber of Fine Arts), a conformist government-established union that artists were obliged to join to continue their professional life.
