= Der Orchideengarten =

German magazine published from 1919–1921

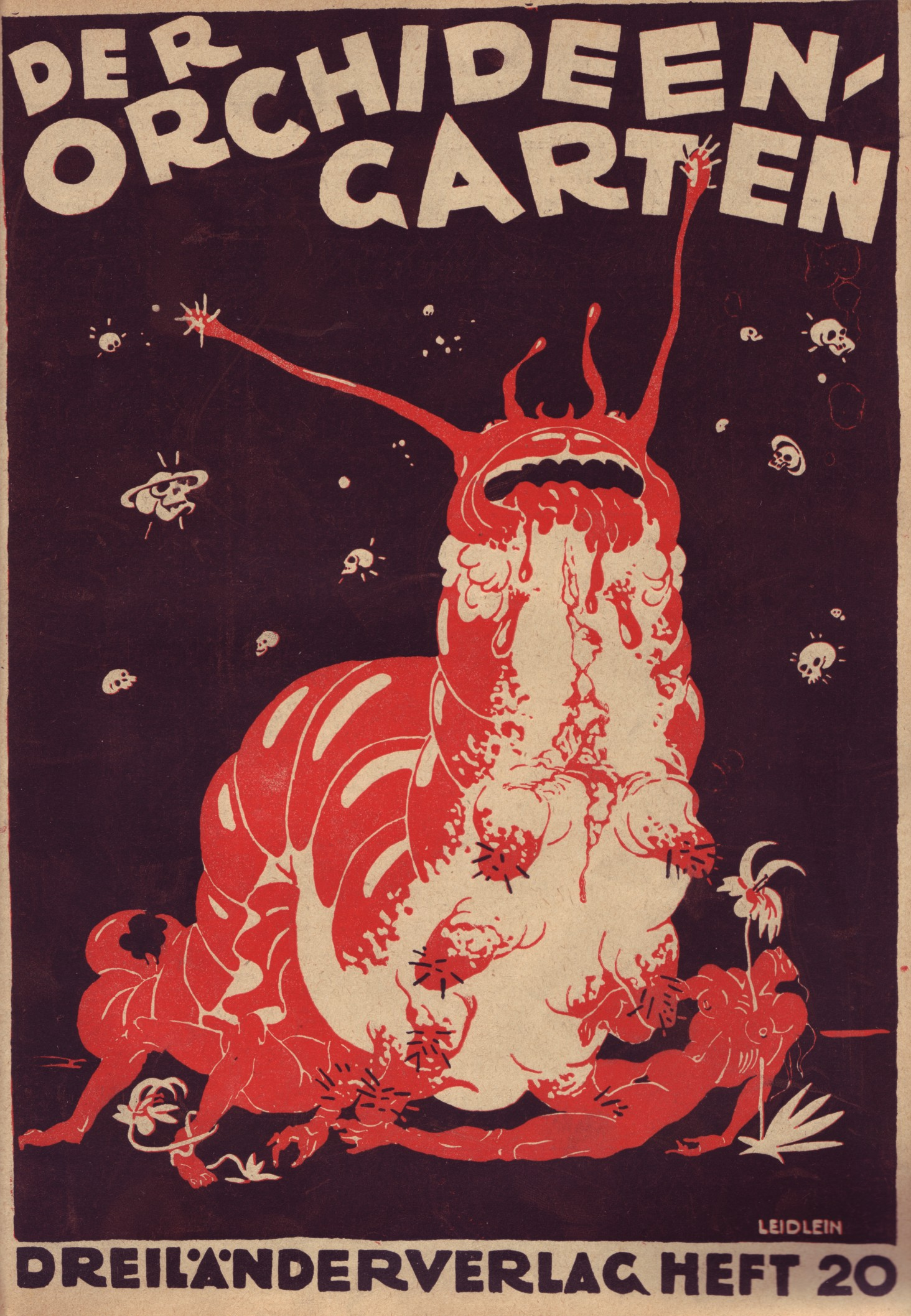
- Der Orchideengarten, 1920 cover
- Editor: Karl Hans Strobl; Alfons von Czibulka
- Categories: Fantasy fiction magazines
- Founded: 1919
- Final issue: 1921
- Company: Dreiländerverlag
- Country: Germany
- Language: German

Der Orchideengarten (English: The Orchid Garden; subtitled Phantastische Blätter or Fantastic Pages) was a German pulp magazine that was published for 51 issues from January 1919 until November 1921.

== History and profile ==
Founded four years before the American magazine Weird Tales was initiated in March 1923, Der Orchideengarten is considered to be the first fantasy magazine. Also described as largely 'supernatural horror', it was edited by World War I correspondent and freelance writer Karl Hans Strobl and Alfons von Czibulka, published by Dreiländerverlag. It had 24 pages per issue printed on rough book paper.

The magazine included a wide selection of new and reprinted stories by both German-language and foreign writers. The main source of the translated material Der Orchideengarteen published was French literature; Der Orchideengarten published works by such authors as Voltaire, Charles Nodier, Guy de Maupassant, Théophile Gautier, Victor Hugo, Villiers de l'Isle-Adam and Guillaume Apollinaire. Other noted writers such as Apuleius, Charles Dickens, Pushkin, Edgar Allan Poe, Washington Irving, Amelia Edwards, Nathaniel Hawthorne, H. G. Wells, Valery Bryusov and Karel and Josef Čapek were all published in Der Ochideengarten. German language writers for the magazine included Strobl, Hermann Harry Schmitz, Leo Perutz and Alexander Moritz Frey, as well as reprinted stories by E. T. A. Hoffmann. Illustrations included reproductions of medieval woodcuts and pictures by Gustave Dore and Tony Johannot, as well as contemporary artists such as Rolf von Hoerschelmann (1885–1947), Otto Linnekogel (1892–1981), Karl Ritter (1888-?), Heinrich Kley, Alfred Kubin, Eric Godal (1899–1969), Carl Rabus, (1898–1982) (famous for his work in the magazine Jugend) Otto Nückel and Max Schenke (1891–1957).
