= Angelo Jank =

German painter

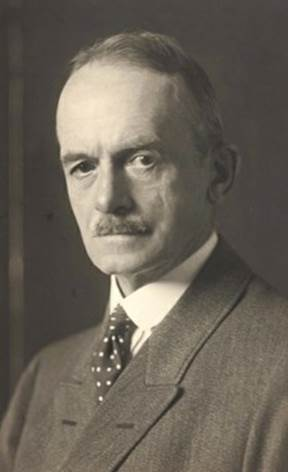
Angelo Jank (date unknown)

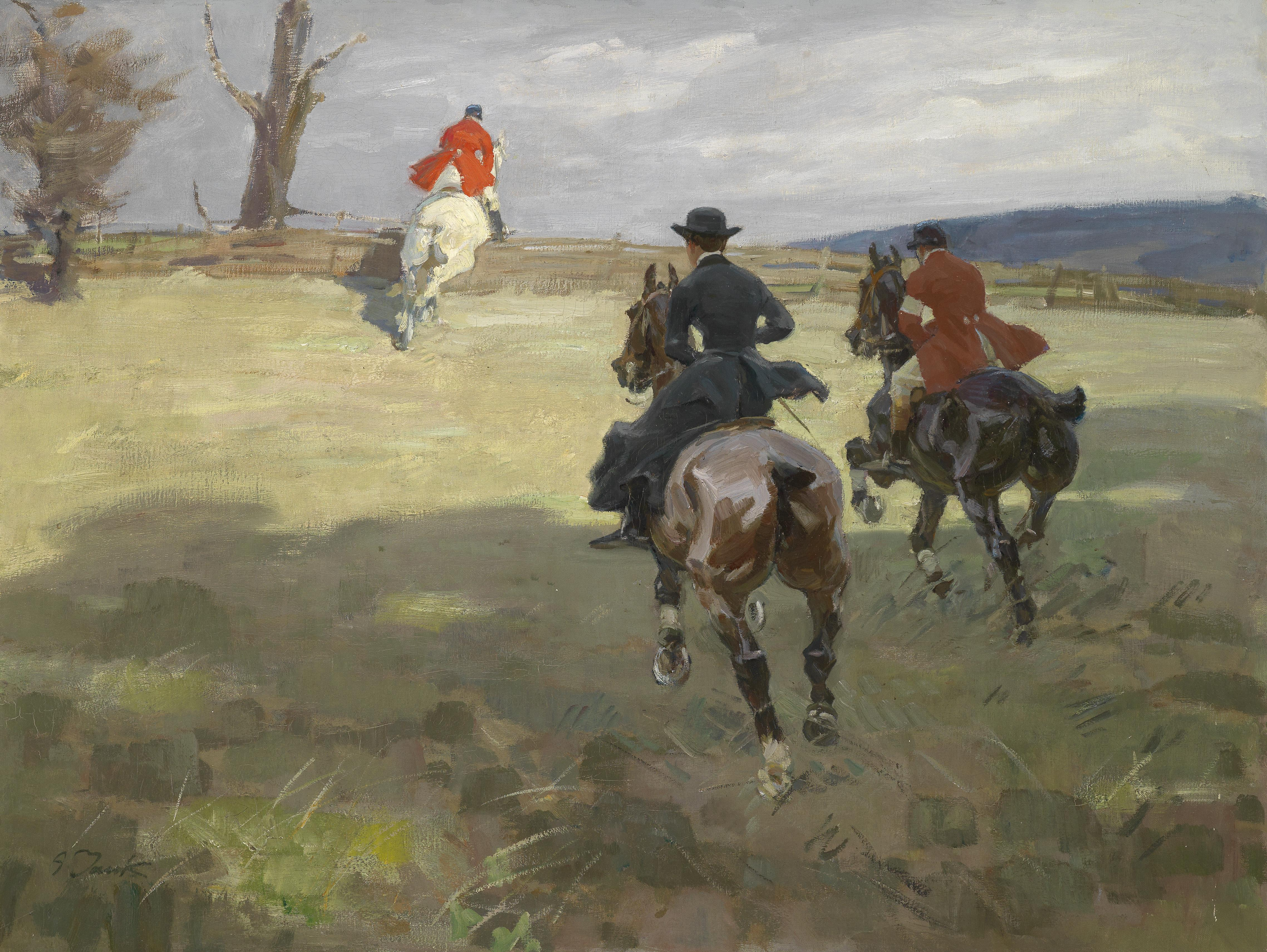
Parforcejagd (Hunting with animals, a title borne by several of his works)

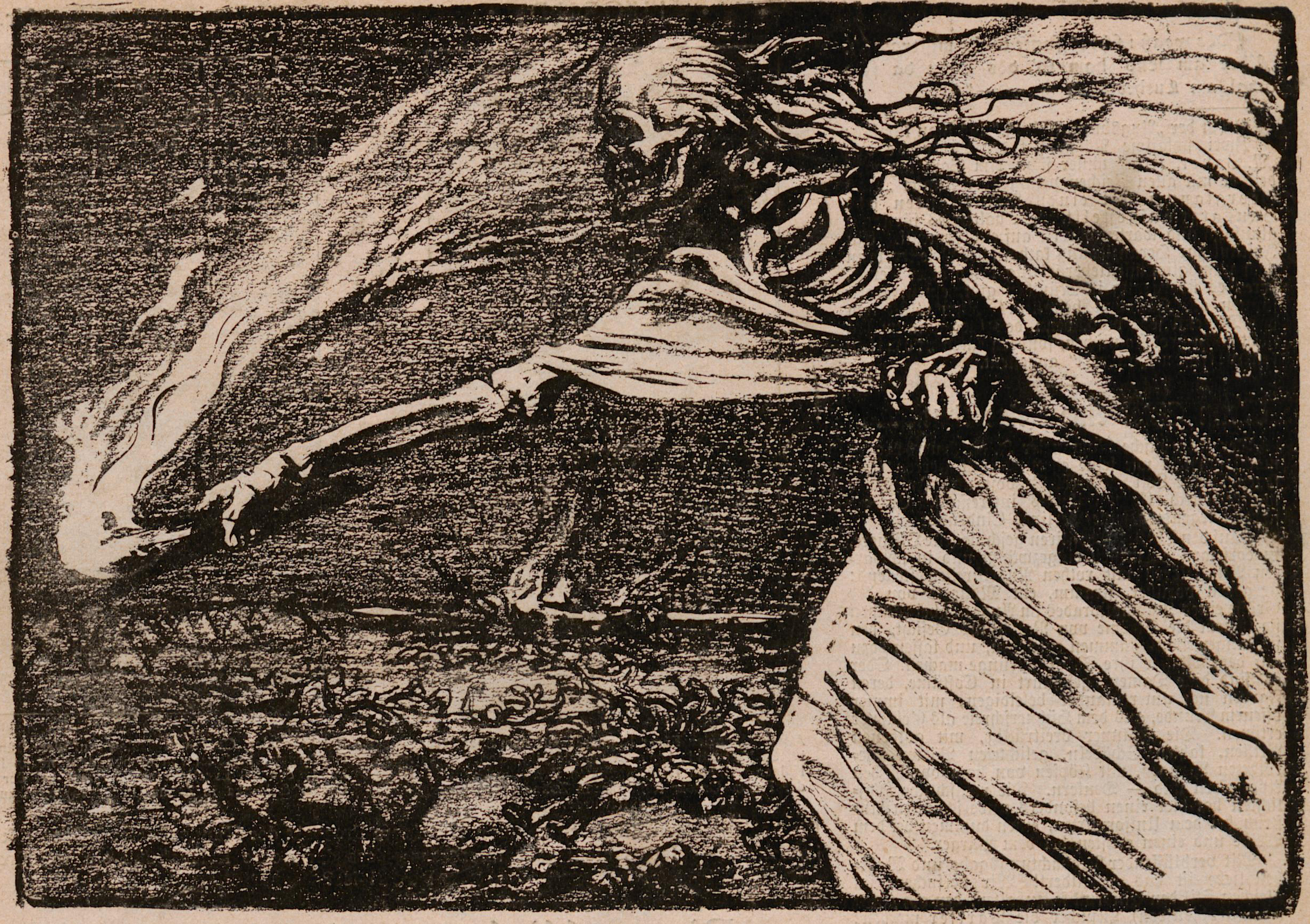
The UK Christmas and New Year's angel

Angelo Jank (30 October 1868 in Munich – 9 October 1940 in Munich) was a German animal painter, illustrator and member of the Munich Secession.

== Early life ==
He was the son of the German painter Christian Jank and specialized in scenes with horses and riders.

After graduating from the Wilhelmsgymnasium in 1888, he studied at the Academy of Fine Arts from 1891 to 1896 with Ludwig von Löfftz and Paul Hoecker and exhibited with several art societies at the Glaspalast. In 1898, he had his first showing with members of the Munich Secession.

== Career ==
From 1899 to 1907, he was a teacher at the Women's Academy of the Munich Artists' Association. He was then appointed a professor at the Academy of Fine Arts, succeeding Wilhelm von Diez. In 1922, following the retirement of Heinrich von Zügel, Jank succeeded him as Professor of Animal Painting. Later, he was elected first Chairman of the "Association of Visual Artists" and presided over their exhibitions at the Glaspalast. For many years, he was also employed as an illustrator for the magazines Jugend and Simplicissimus, And he was also an instructor at the Academy of Fine Arts, where his students included Karl Gatermann the Younger.

In addition to his canvases, he painted murals at the Justizpalast and scenes from history at the Reichstag building in Berlin. Among his best-known students were Louis Grell, Erma Bossi, Nina Arbore, Franz Xaver Stahl (also an animal painter), Henryk Gotlib, Käte Lassen, Carl Rabus and Adolf Ziegler. His work was also part of the painting event in the art competition at the 1936 Summer Olympics.

== Personal life ==
He was married to Baroness Anna von Thüngen (b. 1878), daughter of Hans Karl Freiherr von Thüngen (1851–1926) and Countess Julia Karoline Emilie Auguste Luise Mathilde von Giech-Thurnau (1845–1927). Together, they were the parents of:

- Hans Jank (b. 1905), who married Märta Elisabet Larsson (1914–2006)
- Anna-Luise Ali Jank (b. 1916), who married Baron Bertram Riedesel zu Eisenbach (1909–1944).

An affair with the painter, Marie Schnür, produced a son named Klaus. Schnür later entered into a marriage of convenience with Franz Marc to provide legitimacy for the boy.

=== Descendants ===
Through his son Hans, he was a grandfather of Angela Jank (b. 1951), who married Prince Albrecht of Oettingen-Oettingen und Oettingen-Spielberg.
