= Alfons von Czibulka =

Czech-Austrian writer and painter

Alfons Freiherr von Czibulka, or Alfons Cibulka (born 28 June 1888, Ratboř Castle (Schloss Radborsch) near Kolín, Bohemia – died 22 October 1969, Munich) was a Czech-Austrian writer and painter. (Pseudonym A. von Birnitz).

Czibulka was the son of general Freiherr Hubert von Czibulka and Marie von Birnitz. In 1919 he co-founded the magazine Der Orchideengarten with Karl Hans Strobl, a fantasy magazine which also published some science fiction and detective stories.

In the Third Reich he received the "Literary Prize of the City Munich" in 1938.

== Literary works ==
- Die grossen Kapitäne (biography, 1923)
- Prinz Eugen (biography, 1927)
- Der Münzturm (novel, 1936)
- Der Kerzlmacher von St. Stephan (novel, 1937)
- Das Abschiedskonzert (novel, 1944)
- Reich mir die Hand, mein Leben (novel, 1956)
