= Karl Hans Strobl =

Austrian author and editor (1877–1946)

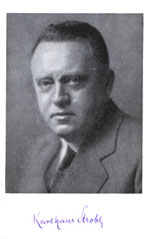
- Born: Karl Hans Strobl; 18 January 1877
- Died: 10 March 1946 (aged 69)

Karl Hans Strobl (18 January 1877, in Jihlava – 10 March 1946, in Perchtoldsdorf) was an Austrian author and editor. Strobl is best known for his horror and fantasy writings. Strobl was a member of the Nazi Party.

== Life ==
Strobl grew up in Moravia and went to the University of Prague, where he was a member of the "Austria" student fraternity. Strobl was an admirer of Rainer Maria Rilke and wrote a review praising Rilke's poetry collection Das Stunden-Buch for a newspaper. Strobl was also influenced by the ideas of Houston Stewart Chamberlain.

Strobl became a prolific writer of fiction, especially "schauerromanen"—horror stories influenced by Edgar Allan Poe and Hanns Heinz Ewers. Fantasy historian Franz Rottensteiner states that regarding his shorter fiction, Strobl "showed himself an able writer" and anthologist Mike Mitchell describes Strobl's short story "The Head" as "a masterpiece of the macabre genre".

After the First World War ended, Strobl relocated to Germany, where he edited the magazine Der Orchideengarten with Alfons von Czibulka; it is regarded as the world's first specialized fantasy magazine.

Strobl's 1910 novel Eleagabal Kuperus was adapted as the film Nachtgestalten in 1920, starring Conrad Veidt and directed by Richard Oswald.

During the First World War, Strobl expressed his advocacy for German nationalism by writing a trilogy of historical novels about Otto von Bismarck.

From the 1920s onward, Strobl became more right-wing and anti-semitic, eventually becoming a supporter of Nazism. Strobl became an advocate of Austria and the Sudetenland being incorporated into German rule; he was expelled from Czechoslovakia in 1934 for pro-Nazi activities.

After the Anschluss he became an important official in the Reich Chamber of Literature, and devoted his literary career solely to producing pro-Nazi propaganda. At the end of the Second World War, Strobl's house in Vienna was looted by the Red Army and he was forced to work on a road repair gang. Released because of illness, he died in a poorhouse in 1946. Strobl's advocacy for Nazism meant his work was briefly banned by the Allies after World War Two.
