= Juergen von Huendeberg =

German painter

Juergen von Huendeberg (aka Hans-Otto Maximilian von Huendeberg, HOMJ von Huendeberg, or simply “Iwan”; 10 April 1922 – 21 August 1996) was a German painter often associated with the abstract art of the post-war years.

== Early Years, Nazi Regime and World War II ==
Juergen von Huendeberg was born 10 April 1922 in Dresden, into a family of Baltic Germans. Since early childhood, he lived in Munich, where he studied architecture and philosophy at the Ludwig-Maximilians-Universität München, two years at the Academy of Fine Arts Munich (1945–1947) and some time under Werner Gilles and Adolf Schinnerer.

During the Nazi regime, as a young man, he was briefly attracted to the Hitler Youth but soon became disenchanted with them. He later became friends with Kurt Huber, who nevertheless encouraged him not to actively join his resistance movement, knowing full well of the danger. As a person without a German passport, von Huendeberg was first not allowed to join in the war efforts; when later all German residents were required to join, a woman friend of his helped him remain undetected. This friend, a doctor much older than he was, also introduced him to morphine to help with his migraines; struggling with the use of opioids, prescription medicine and alcohol was to remain a lifelong effort of his.

== Post-War Period ==
Von Huendeberg's very early paintings were along the lines of Magic Realism, a form of New Objectivity, an art movement that arose in Germany in the early 1920s as an outgrowth of, and in opposition to, expressionism. Soon, however, von Huendeberg's work became almost exclusively abstract. The qualifier “almost” is significant; there was no technique or form of expression that von Huendeberg ever excluded.

In 1949, he became connected with ZEN 49, a group of German artists who strove to create new forms of expression for abstract art. The word Zen was to reflect their rejection of materiality and a focus on meditation; 49 refers to the year they were founded, four years after World War II. Von Huendeberg was friends with and exhibited with some of their members, for example Rupprecht Geiger and Brigitte Meier-Denninghoff in the Studio for New Art (Studio fuer Neue Kunst) in Wuppertal. Von Huendeberg never became an outright member of the group, a sign even back then of his almost renegade refusal to be anyone but himself, to be a member of any group but humanity. Significantly, he also never became a German citizen, proud to his death of the fact that he never had any citizenship (his parents, after being displaced after World War I, held the Nansen passport. This connection to peaceful internationalism was always important to him).

Art critic Franz Roh, one of whose books features a painting by von Huendeberg on the front cover, once spoke of visual art immediately after World War II as containing “the demonic, praised by Goethe as most deep [which] hints at our existential loneliness vis-a-vis the universe – or in the face of a truly inner and productive way of life.” Von Huendeberg's art, which often features dark, almost ominous colours pierced by small patches of deep, shining light, was sometimes interpreted as depressing; Roh's description as “demonic”, which hints, as well, to von Huendeberg's mystic qualities, may be more apt.

== Abstract Art: Colour Without Form ==
Von Huendeberg made much use of the colour gold. Art critic John Anthony Thwaites pointed to von Huendeberg's Russian-Baltic heritage and the golden background used in Russian icons. Art historian Ivo Kranzfelder describes how in his oil paintings, von Huendeberg created a feeling of space by juxtaposing broad planes of colour in almost perspectival arrangements. This depth was underscored by experimenting with adding structure through the use of materials such as sackcloth and sand, thickly textured paint and even incorporating paint tube caps into the painting. The topic of "colour without form" was always on his mind. Collages were a natural extension of these techniques. Just as his paintings often have a sculpted feeling, his collages always evoke the pictorial. A collage consisting of chains and jewels decorating Jesus on the cross points back to the iconic.

== Agnosticism and Psychoanalysis ==
Deeply mystic in his art, von Huendeberg was, however, staunchly rational about religion, a fierce agnostic firmly rooted in the tradition of humanism and the Enlightenment. Partly, his agnostic stand was connected to his interest in and involvement with psychoanalysis. His friendships with various prominent Munich psychoanalysts were an important source of inspiration to him. Von Huendeberg's combination of mysticism and commitment to the rational, paired with his unbridled irreverence, a constant drive to explore new ideas, a steadfast refusal to be categorized, as well as playful irony in close companionship with serious craftsmanship, confused and irritated more than one critic.

== The Success Years ==
Von Huendeberg enjoyed success for quite some years. His were the first two abstract paintings bought by the House of Art (Haus der Kunst), Munich's main museum for modern art. 1956 he received a cultural scholarship from the German Industry Association, 1957 he was invited to the Premio Lissone, 1962 he won the Seerosen-Preis (Lotus Prize) together with Edgar Ende and three other artists. His paintings were shown in Italy, Canada, the US and New Zealand. There were numerous exhibitions in Germany, including one with a close artist friend, Helmut Berninger.

== Disenchantment With The Visual Arts Scene and Other Artistic Endeavours ==
From the mid-1960s on, von Huendeberg lost interest in exhibitions and the visual arts scene and his public life as an artist concentrated on experimental theatre, film and music. Nevertheless, he still worked as a painter, for example when experimenting with etchings with fellow artist Otto Mirtl. The fumes from performing this in an unventilated chamber, combined with his liberal use of alcohol, almost killed him, leaving him in a liver coma for three weeks, which he miraculously survived. Shortly before his hospitalization, he starred in a slide/theatre play as Oblomov, a Russian nobleman full of fabulous ideas but lacking the ability to make any decisions whatsoever. This play, adapted by one of his many protégés, the then young and unknown Franz Xaver Kroetz, mirrored much of who von Huendeberg was – a brilliant artist who at times was incapable of leaving the house for years on end, haunted by depression and addiction. For years, von Huendeberg also worked closely with avantgarde theatre artists Alexeij Sagerer and Cornelie Mueller and had friendships with film personalities such as Rainer Werner Fassbinder and Klaus Kinski.

== More Than Just a Post-War Curiosity ==
In art circles, Juergen von Huendeberg is usually discussed in connection with the avantgarde of the 1950s and 1960s. But as art historian Ivo Kranzfelder states, it would be a great mistake to see him only as a historical phenomenon. While his charcoal drawings and oil paintings from this time are important, his erotic drawings and watercolours, experimentations with markers and spray paint and hundreds of acrylic gouaches where he doggedly pursued the exploration of spherical shapes and even his landscape sketches and portraits show a never ending variety and growth in his artistic expression. Shortly before his death, he only seemingly returned to his roots, painting in oil once again generous geometric shapes, mostly in earth tones, always illuminating his paintings with his trademark brilliant light effects. However, this return was an evolution, on a higher level of Goethe's spiral of growth that von Huendeberg liked to cite frequently.

== Personal Data ==
Von Huendeberg died on 21 August 1996 of pancreatic cancer, meeting his death with the same conscious, curious and nonchalant eyes that saw and depicted all of his life. He was married to Elisabeth, née Hennighaussen, a music librarian. They had three children, Nikolaus (1953–1954), Isabella (born 1955) and Clarissa (born 1961).
