= Otto Rumpf =

German sculptor

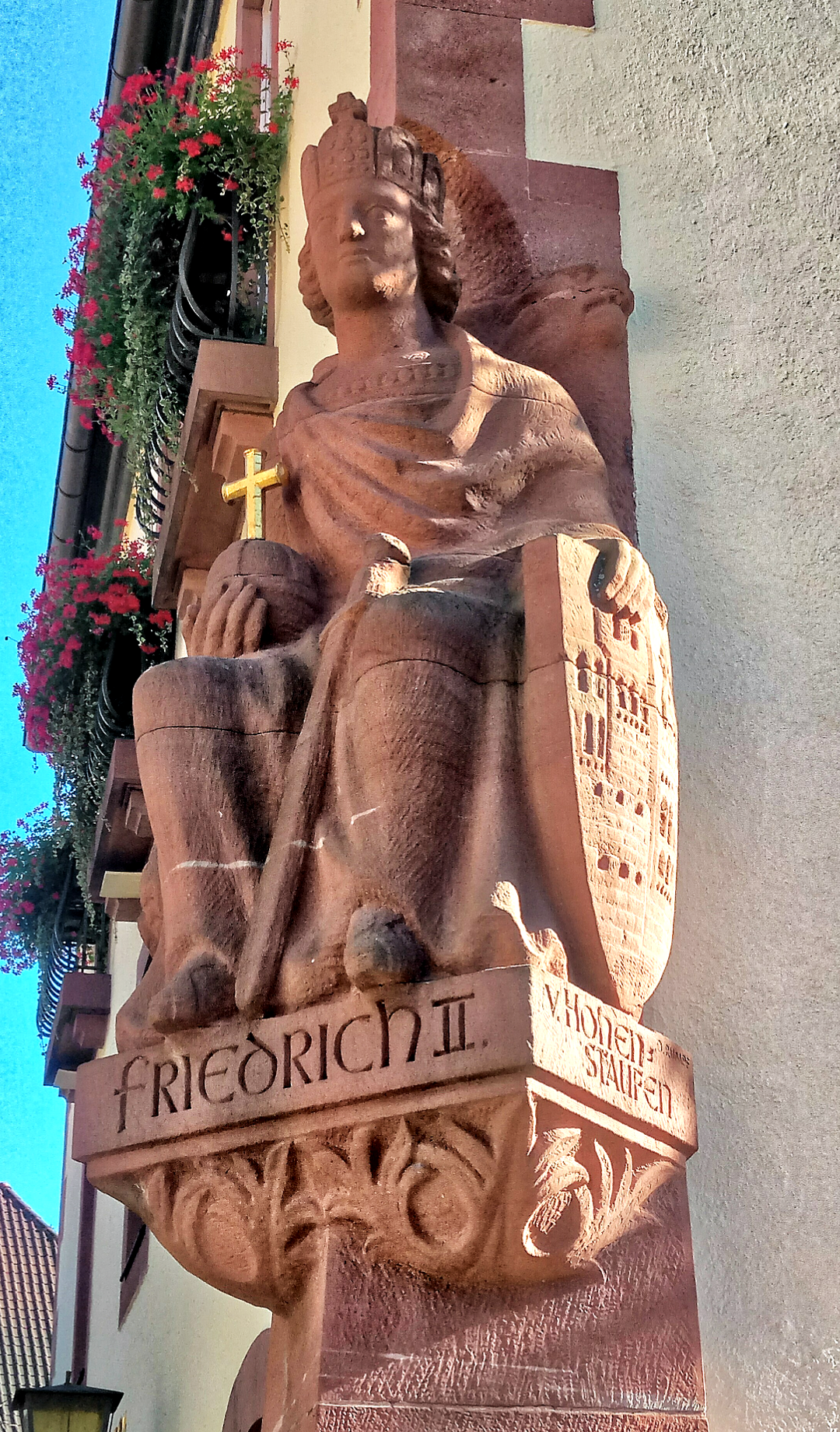
Otto Rumpf: Frederick II, Holy Roman Emperor at the Annweiler town hall, signed figure in the outdoor area

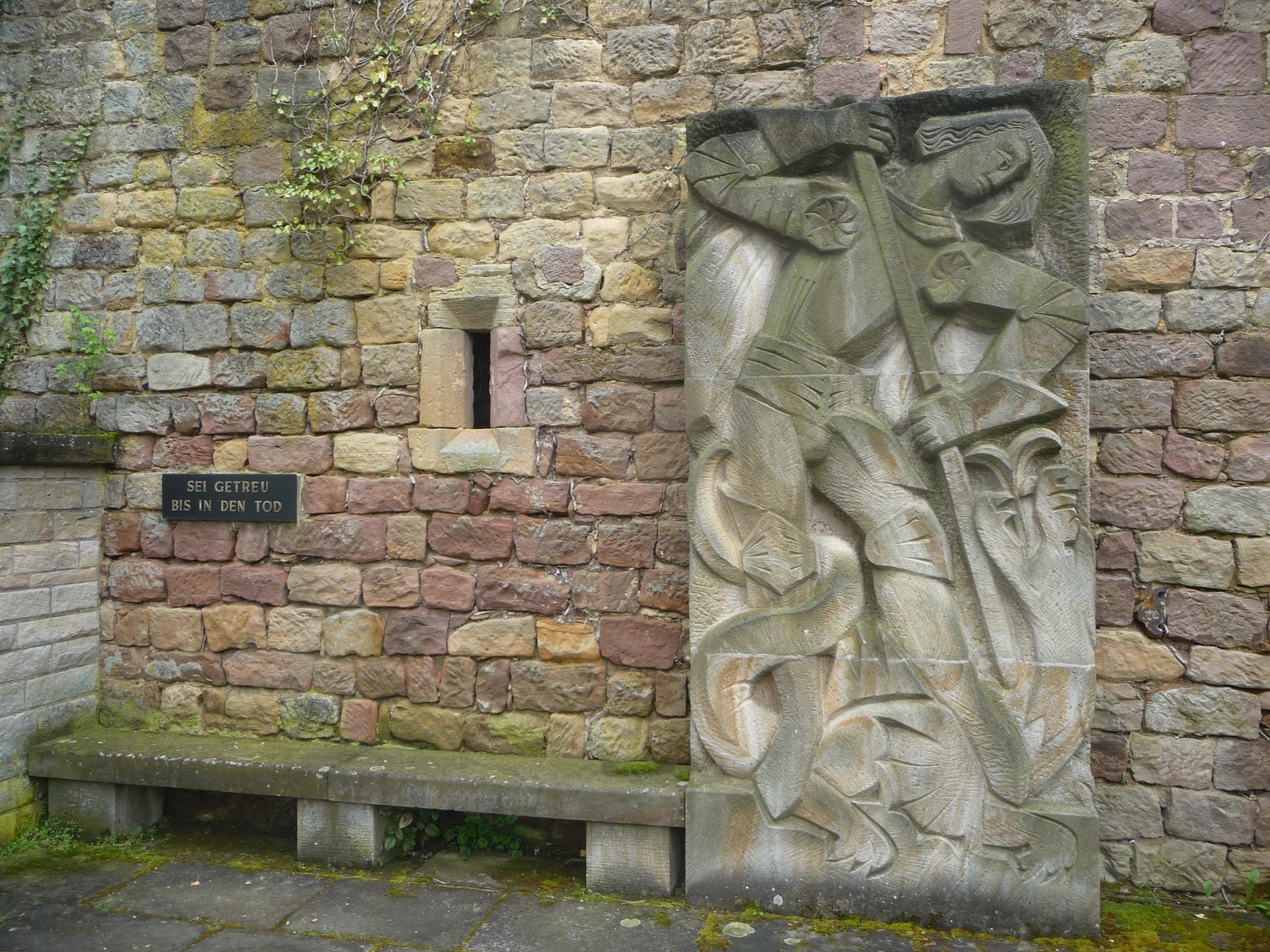
War memorial Neuleiningen, by Otto Rumpf, 1964

Otto Rumpf (27 September 1902 – 3 October 1984) was a German sculptor.

== Life ==
Born in Obermoschel, Rumpf was the progenitor of the Kaiserslautern Rumpf family of sculptors. He was married to the sculptor Martha Jung (1910–1996). Their son is the sculptor Gernot Rumpf.

Rumpf first learned in the sculpture workshop of his father Ludwig Rumpf, from 1926 to 1933 he attended the Academy of Fine Arts in Munich and was a student of Hermann Hahn. From 1934 to 1943 he headed the sculpture department of the "Meisterschule des Deutschen Handwerk" in Kaiserslautern. Among his students here from 1938 to 1942 was Erich Koch, in the years 1975 to 1990 professor at the Academy of Fine Arts Munich.

After military service and imprisonment, Rumpf founded his own workshop in Lachen-Speyerdorf in 1946 (since 1969 part of Neustadt an der Weinstraße). In addition to his artistic activities, he taught again at the Kaiserslautern master school from 1960-1965.

Rumpd died in Bad Dürkheim at the age of 82.

== Work ==
- 1951: Frederick II, Holy Roman Emperor, Außenfigur am Rathaus Annweiler
- 1953: Europa auf dem Stier, Electoral Palace, Koblenz (Skulptur am nördlichen Treppenaufgang, Innenbereich)
- 1964: Kriegerdenkmal Neuleiningen, St. Georg
