= Emil Krieger =

German sculptor

Emil Krieger (8 September 1902, Kaiserslautern – 6 September 1979, Munich) was a German sculptor and artist, especially known for his graphic work and sculpture in bronze, wood, stone and terracotta. His most notable works are the group of four mourners at Langemark German war cemetery, the fountains at the Innenministerium in Munich, the Memorial in Treuchtlingen, the busts of Richard Wagner and of Karl von Fischer in the Bayerisches Nationaltheater, and two large reliefs for the Gedächtniskirche in Kaiserslautern.

== Life ==
He studied woodcarving at the Meisterschule from 1917 to 1921, and in 1921 in Munich at the Kunstgewerbschule. His early teachers included Richard Riemerschmid, Adolf Schinnerer and Adelbert Niemeyer. Between 1925 and 1931 he became a member of the Akademie der Bildenden Künste, where he was taught by Josef Wackerle and Julius Diez. Under Wackerle he developed his own graphic style and in 1928 he organized his first exhibition.

In the 1930s, he travelled to Holland, France and Spain. In 1936, he won the Rompreis, enabling him to travel to Italy and Greece. Between 1946 and 1977, he taught at the Münchener Akademie. He became professor at the Akademie der Bildender Künste in Munich, was honoured by the Bayerische Akademie der Schönen Künste and received also the silver and golden Seerose.

== Sources ==
- The Great War in Flanders Fields
