= Karin Gatermann =

German mathematician

Karin Gatermann (1961–2005) was a German mathematician whose research topics included computer algebra, sum-of-squares optimization, toric varieties, and dynamical systems of chemical reactions.

== Early life and education ==
Gatermann was born on 18 December 1961, in Bad Oldesloe. She studied mathematics at the University of Hamburg, earning a diploma in 1986 and completing a Ph.D. in 1990 through the university's Institute for Applied Mathematics. Her 1989 dissertation, Gruppentheoretische Konstruktion von symmetrischen Kubaturformeln [Group-theoretic construction of symmetric cubature formulas], was supervised by Bodo Werner.

== Career and later life ==
From 1995 until 2001, Gatermann worked as an assistant lecturer at the Free University of Berlin, earning a habilitation there in 1999.

She came to the University of Western Ontario ("Western University") in Canada from 2001 to 2002, through the support of an Ontario Research Chair in Computer Algebra. After a year in Germany, supported by a Heisenberg Fellowship of the German Research Foundation, she returned to Western University as an assistant professor in 2004, and was awarded a Tier II Canada Research Chair in late 2004. However, by then she had returned to Germany to be treated for cancer, to which she succumbed on 1 January 2005.

== Recognition ==
A colloquium in honor of Gatermann was held in 2006 in Hamburg. In 2009, a special issue of the Journal of Symbolic Computation was dedicated to the memory of Gatermann.

== Selected publications ==
- Gatemann, K. (1990). "Symbolic solution polynomial equation systems with symmetry". Proceedings of the international symposium on Symbolic and algebraic computation. pp. 112–119. doi:10.1145/96877.96907. ISBN 0-201-54892-5.
- Verschelde, J.; Gatermann, K.; Cools, R. (1996), "Mixed-volume computation by dynamic lifting applied to polynomial system solving", Discrete & Computational Geometry, 16 (1): 69–112, doi:10.1007/BF02711134, MR 1397788, Zbl 0854.68111
- Gatermann, Karin (2000), Computer Algebra Methods for Equivariant Dynamical Systems, Lecture Notes in Mathematics, vol. 1728, Berlin: Springer-Verlag, doi:10.1007/BFb0104059, ISBN 3-540-67161-7, MR 1755001, Zbl 0944.65131
- Gatermann, Karin; Huber, Birkett (2002), "A family of sparse polynomial systems arising in chemical reaction systems", Journal of Symbolic Computation, 33 (3): 275–305, doi:10.1006/jsco.2001.0512, MR 1882230, Zbl 0994.92040
- Gatermann, Karin; Parrilo, Pablo A. (2004), "Symmetry groups, semidefinite programs, and sums of squares", Journal of Pure and Applied Algebra, 192 (1–3): 95–128, arXiv:math/0211450, doi:10.1016/j.jpaa.2003.12.011, MR 2067190, Zbl 1108.13021
- Gatermann, Karin; Eiswirth, Markus; Sensse, Anke (2005), "Toric ideals and graph theory to analyze Hopf bifurcations in mass action systems", Journal of Symbolic Computation, 40 (6): 1361–1382, doi:10.1016/j.jsc.2005.07.002, MR 2178092, Zbl 1120.13033
