= Carl Rabus =

German painter

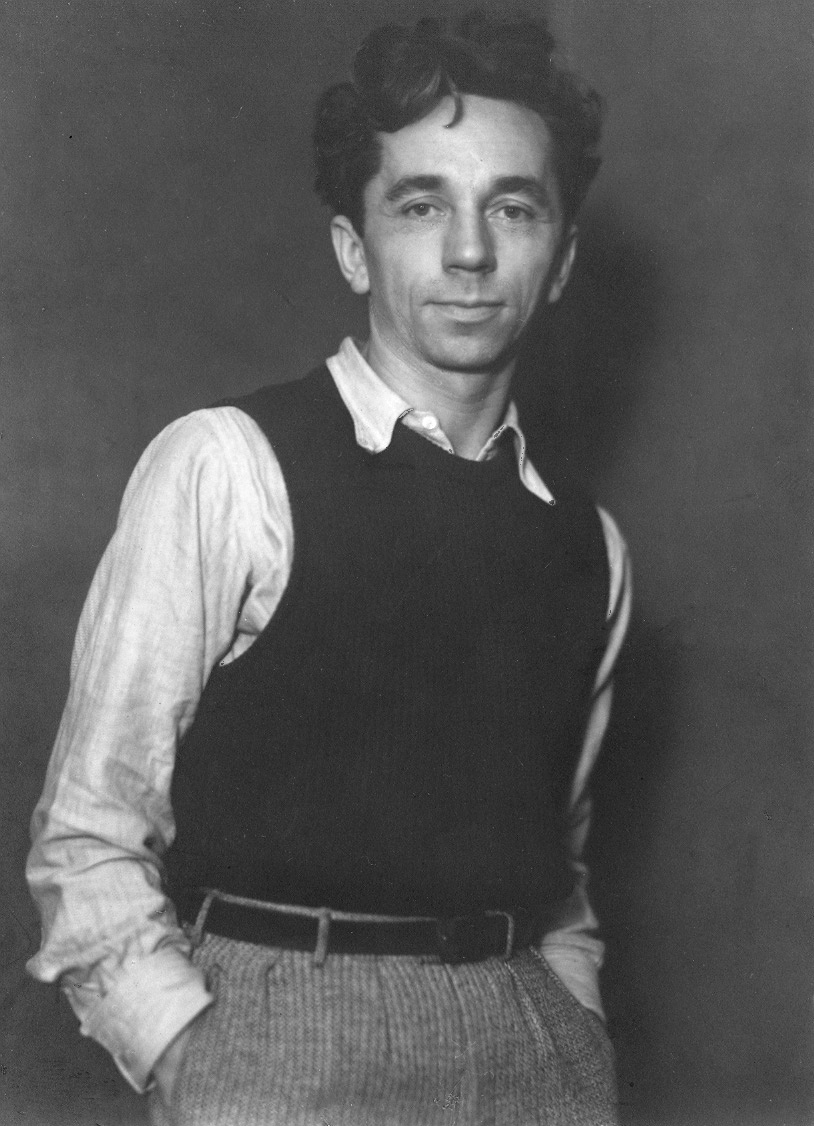
Carl Rabus

Carl Johann Rabus (May 30, 1898 – July 28, 1983) was a German expressionist artist and painter who was persecuted by the Nazis.

== Biography ==
Rabus was born in Kempten, and studied under Angelo Jank at the academy in Munich. After various art exhibitions organized by Hans Goltz in Munich and by Der Sturm in Berlin Rabus worked as a book- and art illustrator in Berlin from 1923 till 1927. His works were published by several magazines like Eulenspiegel, Der Orchideengarten and Jugend. Along with contemporaries including Jacob Steinhardt, Richard Janthur, Heinrich Richter-Berlin, and Conrad Felixmüller, Rabus "revived the techniques of woodcut and wood-engraving synonymous with the Die Brücke circle of artists and German Expressionism".

Upon the Nazi takeover in Germany in 1933, Rabus moved to Vienna, Austria, where he met his wife-to-be, Jewish photographer Erna Adler.

However, they soon had to leave the country because of the imminent annexation to the Third Reich. They fled to Brussels but in 1940 they were arrested in Belgium after the invasion of the German Army. Erna Adler was released but Rabus was incarcerated at the detention camp Saint-Cyprien in Southern France.

In 1941 he was able to escape from the camp and he returned to Brussels. There he was arrested again in 1943 on a charge of Rassenschande. Rabus was deported and had to spend some time in the Vienna City Prison.

In 1944 he married Erna Adler and after the war they lived in Essen, Munich and Brussels. Eventually they settled down in Murnau am Staffelsee in 1974 where Carl Rabus died on July 28, 1983. He was survived by his wife, Erna.
