= Koblenz cable car =

Gondola lift in Koblenz, Germany

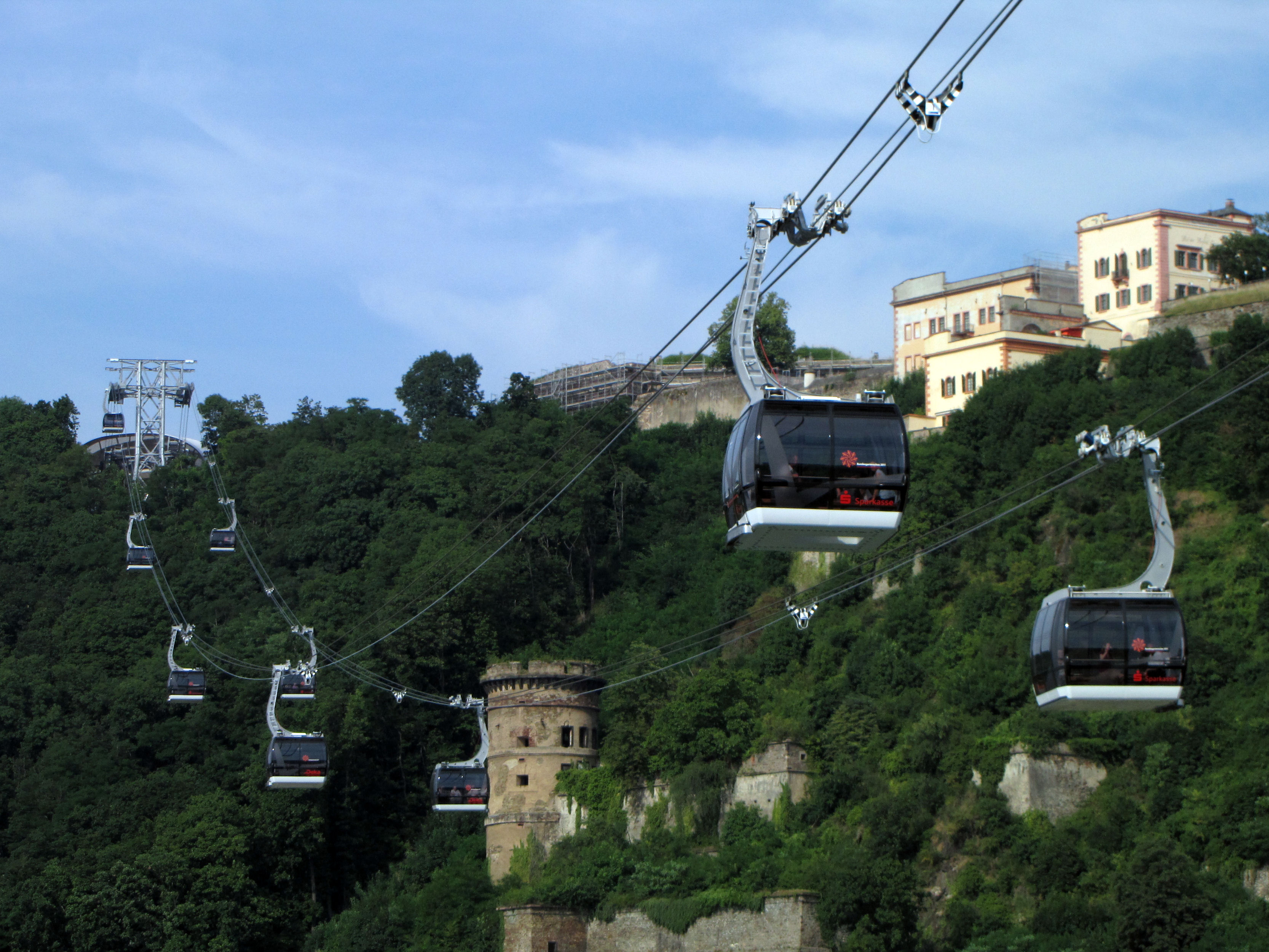
- Interactive map of Koblenz cable car

Overview
- Status: Operational
- Location: Koblenz, Germany
- Termini: Rhine river bank Ehrenbreitstein, Koblenz
- No. of stations: 2
- Open: 4 July 2010

Operation
- Operator: Skyglide Event Deutschland GmbH
- Carrier capacity: 18 cabins, maximum of 35 adult passengers per cabin, 7600 passengers per hour either way

Technical features
- Aerial lift type: Tri-cable gondola detachable
- Line length: 890 m (2,920 ft)
- Operating speed: 4.5 metres per second

The Koblenz cable car (German: Seilbahn Koblenz, also Buga-Seilbahn or Rheinseilbahn) is a gondola lift that was opened in 2010 in Koblenz, Germany for the Bundesgartenschau (a biennial exhibition) the following year.

== Cable car ==
It connects the banks of the river Rhine and the hill plateau next to Ehrenbreitstein Fortress. The cable car system has an 890m length and elevates 112m.

The gondola system has an hourly capacity of 7600 people, the most for any such a ride in the world. It operates usually between April and October of a given year. Its construction and operation is in control by an Austrian company specialized in such rides, the Doppelmayr Gruppe.

== See also ==
- Federal Horticultural Show 2011
- Cologne Cable Car, which was also built for a Bundesgartenschau in 1957.
