= Karl Gatermann the Younger =

German painter

Karl Gatermann (June 17, 1909 – April 3, 1992), typically referred to in art circles as Karl Gatermann the Younger, was a German painter, graphic artist, and set designer. He was the nephew of his namesake, Karl Gatermann, also an artist.

== Life ==
Gatermann trained as a decorator while working for his father in Zerbst. He attended art school at the Kunstgewerbeschule in Dessau with Wilhelm Danz in 1926, and from 1927 studied at Bauhaus Dessau with Walter Gropius, Wassily Kandinsky, Paul Klee and Lyonel Feininger. In 1928, he received a journeyman's certificate, and he passed his Master's examination in 1933.

Paying for his studies required occasionally working in the painting class of the Berufsschule in Zerbst. From 1935 until the beginning of World War II, he studied at the Academy of Fine Arts, Munich. His teachers there were Angelo Jank, Max Doerner, Adolf Schinnerer, Max Mayrshofer, and Emil Preetorius.

As a set designer, he worked at the Bavarian State Opera in Munich as well as at the opera houses in Magdeburg and Bernburg; he also worked at Bavaria Film in Munich, on the sets of feature film Philine with Theo Lingen.

After the war, Gatermann mainly painted landscape oil paintings from the Munich area. The Munich art publishing house Emil Köhn purchased many of his mountain paintings and reproduced them as art postcards. Gatermann declared himself as the first painter of the Munich parkland. His style approached late-impressionism during this period.

== Selected works ==
- Wide landscape with grazing cows, oil / board, signed K. Gaterman, local indication Munich, dated 22.9.48, 50x70.5 cm
- Autumnal forest, oil / board, signed K. Gaterman, Ortsangabe München, dated 16.10.48, backside designated K. Gatermann, 60x80 cm
- Field between Johanniskirchen and Unterföhring, oil / canvas, signed K. Gaterman, dated 1952, place description Munich, 60.5 × 80.5 cm

== Signature differences between Elder and Younger ==
Both Karl Gatermanns signed their work "K. Gatermann", however with regard to the Elder, only his early works occasionally included the notation "Munich". These few paintings were created during his studies there before World War I. From 1919 onward, the Elder did not include the "Munich" notation, since he had returned to Lübeck.

The Younger, on the other hand, usually added "Munich" beneath his signature, since he lived and worked there. Additionally, from around 1950, the Younger usually signed in printed letters, which the Elder never did.
