= Karl Gatermann the Elder =

German painter (1883–1959)

Karl Gatermann (July 19, 1883 – February 14, 1959), typically referred to as Karl Gatermann the Elder, was a German painter and graphic artist. He was the uncle of artist Karl Gatermann, who is typically called "Karl Gatermann the Younger" to distinguish between the two.

== Life ==
Gatermann was born in Mölln, in 1883. His mother was part of a family of musicians. After completing of an elementary school in Mölln, he completed an apprenticeship as a decorator. He traveled between Dessau, Munich and Hesse from 1901 to 1903. Then he studied at the art school on Lübeck under Leo von Lütgendorff from 1904 to 1907. The financial support of the Lübeck physician and local researcher Rudolf Struck (Gatermann illustrated Struck's books The Old Civic Residence in Lübeck, Volumes I and II) enabled him to study in Munich's Academy of Fine Arts. There he studied from 1907 to 1914 and became a master with Hugo von Habermann.

In 1910 he received the First Prize for Painting of the City of Munich for the oil painting Life.

From 1919 to 1942 he lived and worked in Lübeck. In 1919 he became a co-founder and temporarily second chairman of the Lübecker Bildender Künstler. In the summer of 1922, he accompanied Rudolf von Laban and his dance group, creating an expressive cycle of movement studies. In Berlin in 1923 and 1925, he exhibited his watercolors in the galleries of Rudolf Wiltschek and the Kunsthaus Heumann in Hamburg in 1926. Wiltschek conducted a Berlin-London art exchange with a London gallery; Gatermann's watercolors were also shown in England and in the London Times. In 1928, he became acquainted with the painters Otto Niemeyer-Holstein, Ernst Frick, Albert Kohler and the writer Werner von der Schulenburg. In 1942, during the Allied bombing of Lübeck, about 100 of his oil paintings and 125 watercolors were destroyed. He died of a stroke in 1959.

== Works ==
Gatermann predominantly focused on north German landscapes and cities, though he also painted still life and figurative scenes, and portraits of people including Marie Curie, Wilhelm Furtwangler, Otto Bernheimer, Julius Eugen Kopsch, Hans-Peter Mainzberg, and Otto Anthes.
