= Delvaux =

Delvaux is a surname. Notable people with the surname include:

- Albert Delvaux (1918–1985), Congolese politician
- André Delvaux (1926–2002), Belgian film director
- Anne Delvaux (born 1970), Belgian politician
- Berthe di Vito-Delvaux (1915–2005), Belgian composer
- Henry Delvaux de Fenffe, Belgian politician
- Jean Delvaux (died 1595), Belgian Roman Catholic monk
- Laurent Delvaux (1696–1778), Flemish sculptor
- Paul Delvaux (1897–1994), Belgian painter

== Other ==
- Delvaux (company) Belgian manufacturer of fine leather luxury goods
- 1848 Delvaux, main-belt asteroid
