= Electoral Palace, Trier =

Palace in Trier, Germany

Coordinates: 49°45′11″N 6°38′37″E

Electoral Palace
- Kurfürstliches Palais
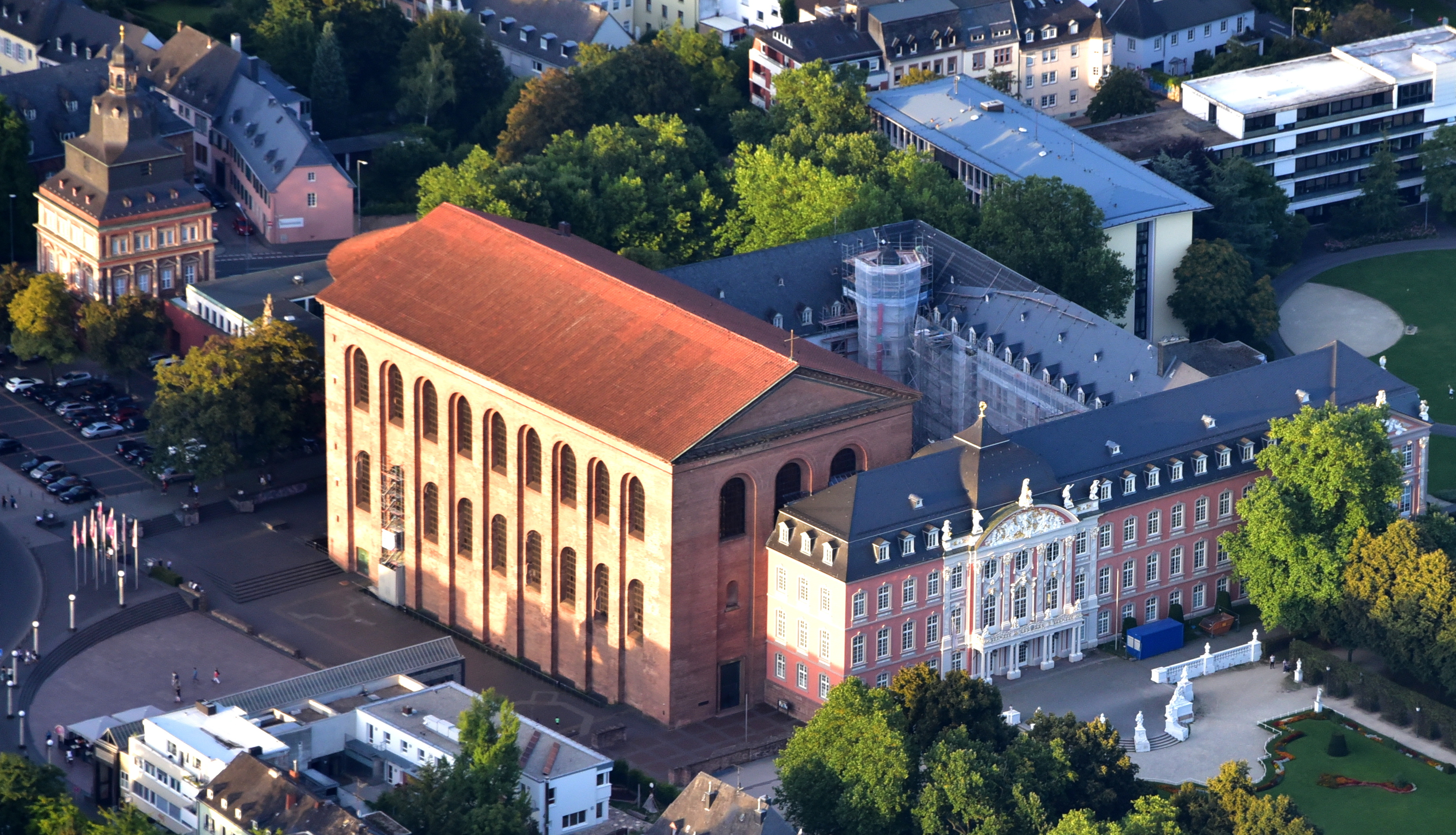
- The palace with the Basilica of Constantine in the centre. Top left the Red Tower
- Interactive map of the Electoral Palace area

General information
- Location: Trier, Germany
- Construction started: 16th century
- Completed: ca. 1750

Design and construction
- Architect: Johannes Seiz (south wing)

The Electoral Palace (German: Kurfürstliches Palais) in Trier, Germany, was the residence of the Archbishops and Electors of Trier from the 16th century until the late 18th century. It now houses various offices of the federal government and often hosts classical music concerts.

== History ==
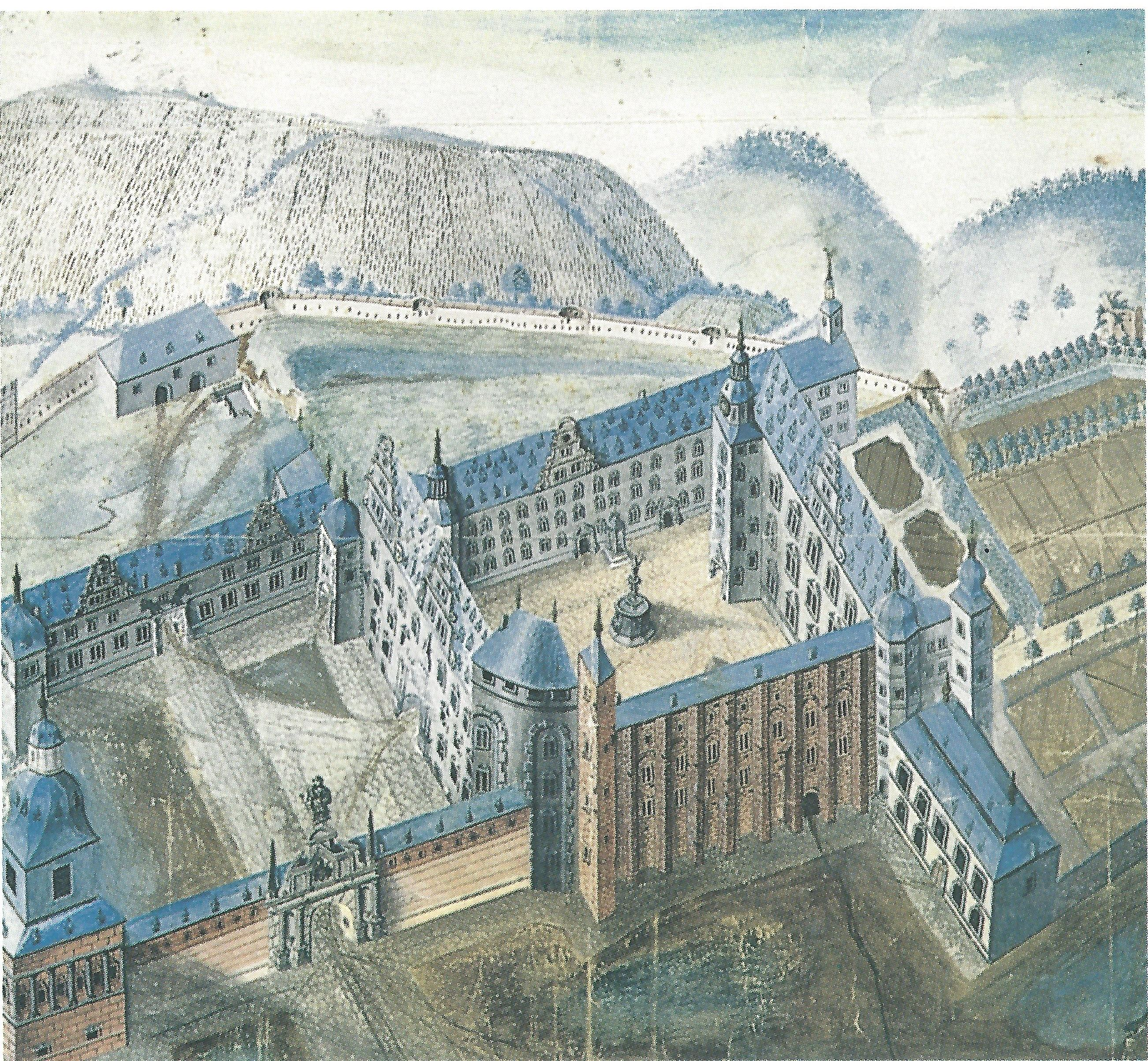
The palace around 1745, before the south wing reconstruction. The west wall and apse of the Basilica remain. On the left the Niederschloss; on the right the Hochschloss

The site of the current Electoral Palace was already part of the Ancient Roman Imperial Palace that was used by Constantine the Great in the early 4th century. The (Basilica of Constantine or Aula Palatina,) used as the Elector's throne room, is Roman. Some Roman mosaics also survive.

From the 11th century onward the archbishops of Trier used the Basilica, of which only the outer walls were standing, as a stronghold. The apse was fortified to serve as a bergfried and merlons were added to the other walls.

In the late 16th century, archbishop Johann von Schönenberg planned building a residence in the style of the German Renaissance for which parts of the Medieval fortress, as well as many houses, were demolished. It was only because the Roman walls proved to be resistant that some of them were incorporated in the new structure. Von Schönenberg's successors, Lothar von Metternich and Philipp Christoph von Sötern, completed the lower palace (Niederschloss) around 1650. The new residence was known as Saint Peter's Castle (St. Petersburg), after the town's patron saint. A chapel dedicated to Saint Lawrence stood on the south-west corner. In the same period work had started on the upper palace wings (Hochschloss) but this project was halted as a result of the Thirty Years' War. At this time, the bishops preferred their Koblenz residence at Ehrenbreitstein, which was considered safer.

From 1756 onwards, archbishop-elector Johann IX Philipp von Walderdorff had the south wing of the Trier Palace rebuilt in Rococo style by Johannes Seiz. Around the same time the Baroque gardens were fitted out with garden statues by Ferdinand Tietz.

In 1794 the French revolutionary armies conquered half of the Rhineland, including Trier. The Electoral Palace was confiscated and used as barracks. This continued after the Prussians took over in 1814.

Around 1850 it was decided that the Basilica of Constantine was going to be rebuilt as it had appeared in the fourth century. For that reason the west wing of the Electoral Palace (then barracks) were to be demolished. In the original plans, the south wing would be demolished too but this was prevented as the Rococo staircase in the interior was considered monumental even then.

During the Second World War the palace was severely damaged. After the war only the Hochschloss was restored. The Niederschloss was demolished except for the Red Tower and the Petersburg Gate.

Today most of the palace is in use as governmental offices. Classical music concerts are performed in the Grand Chamber of the rococo south wing and the courtyard. Part of the north wing is used by the Evangelical-Lutheran congregation of Trier which holds its services in the adjacent Basilica.

== Architecture ==
=== Exterior Niederschloss ===
Of the Niederschloss only the Red Tower (Roter Turm, 1647) and the Petersburg Portal (1620s) remain. It was not until 1968 that the Red Tower got its roof back. It was then used as a bell tower for the Basilica. The site of the demolished wings is now called Willy-Brandt-Platz. It features a "water dial fountain" (Wasseruhrbrunnen). This was designed by Frankfurt artist Karl-Jakob Schwalbach in 1984.

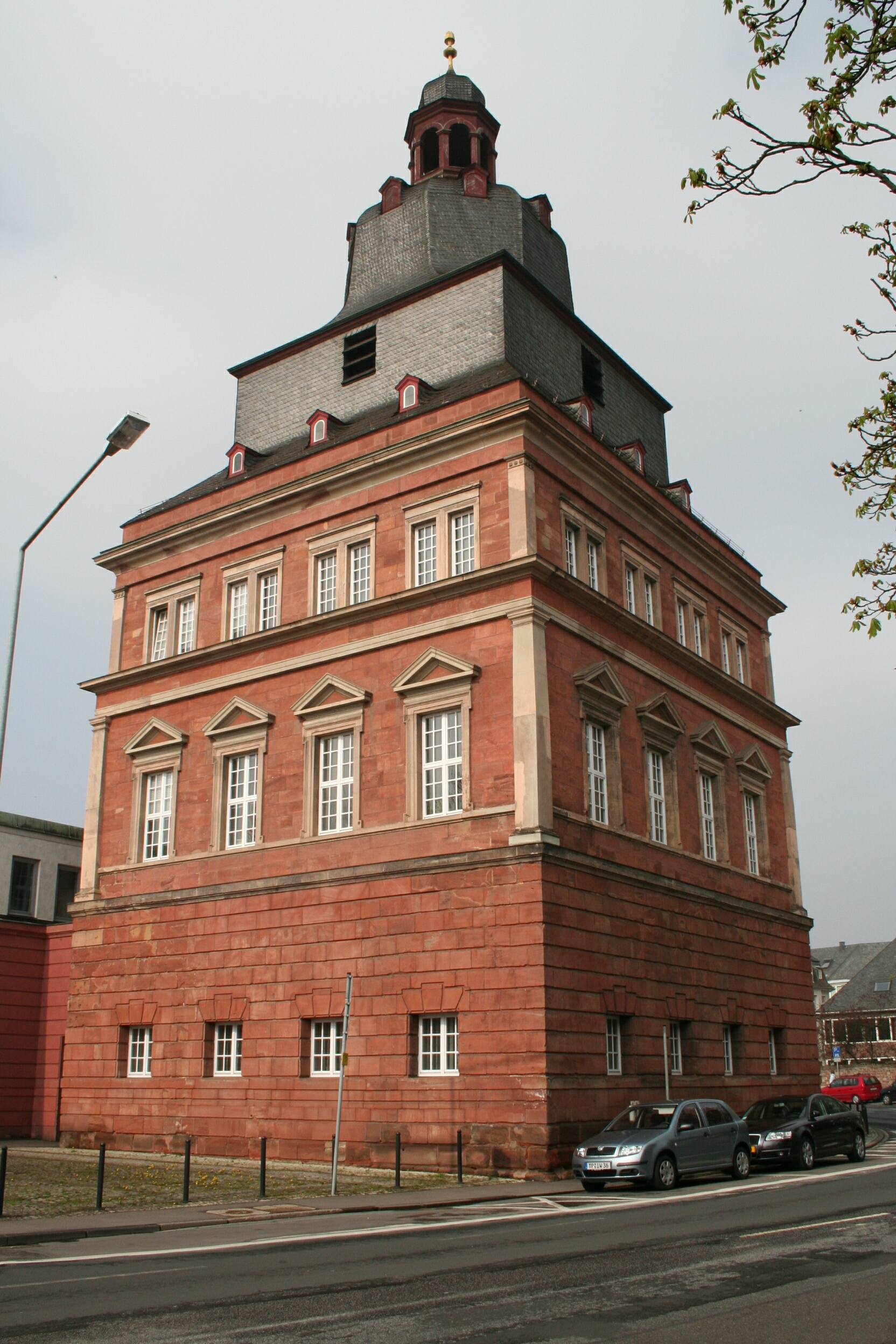
Red Tower

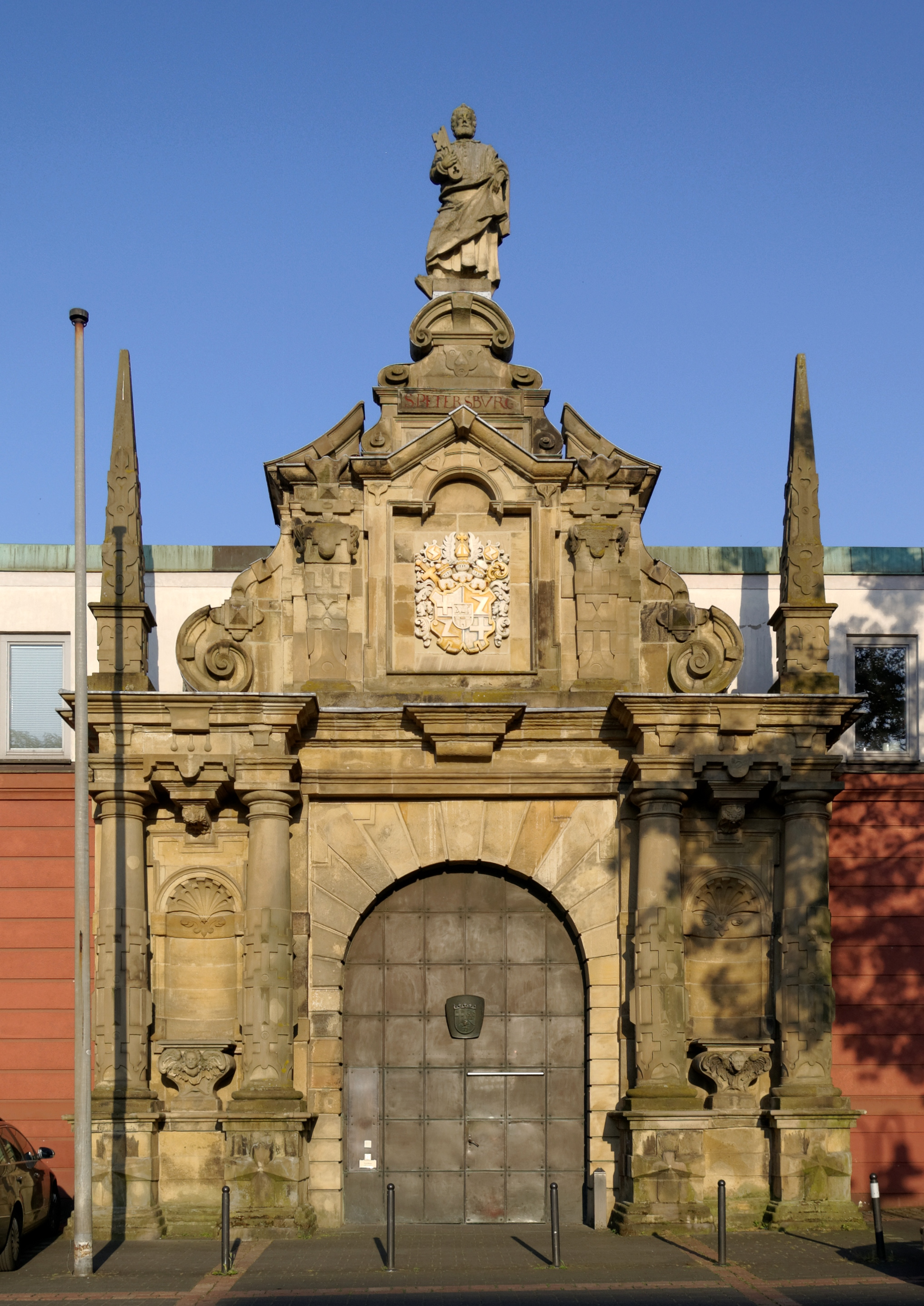
Petersburg Portal

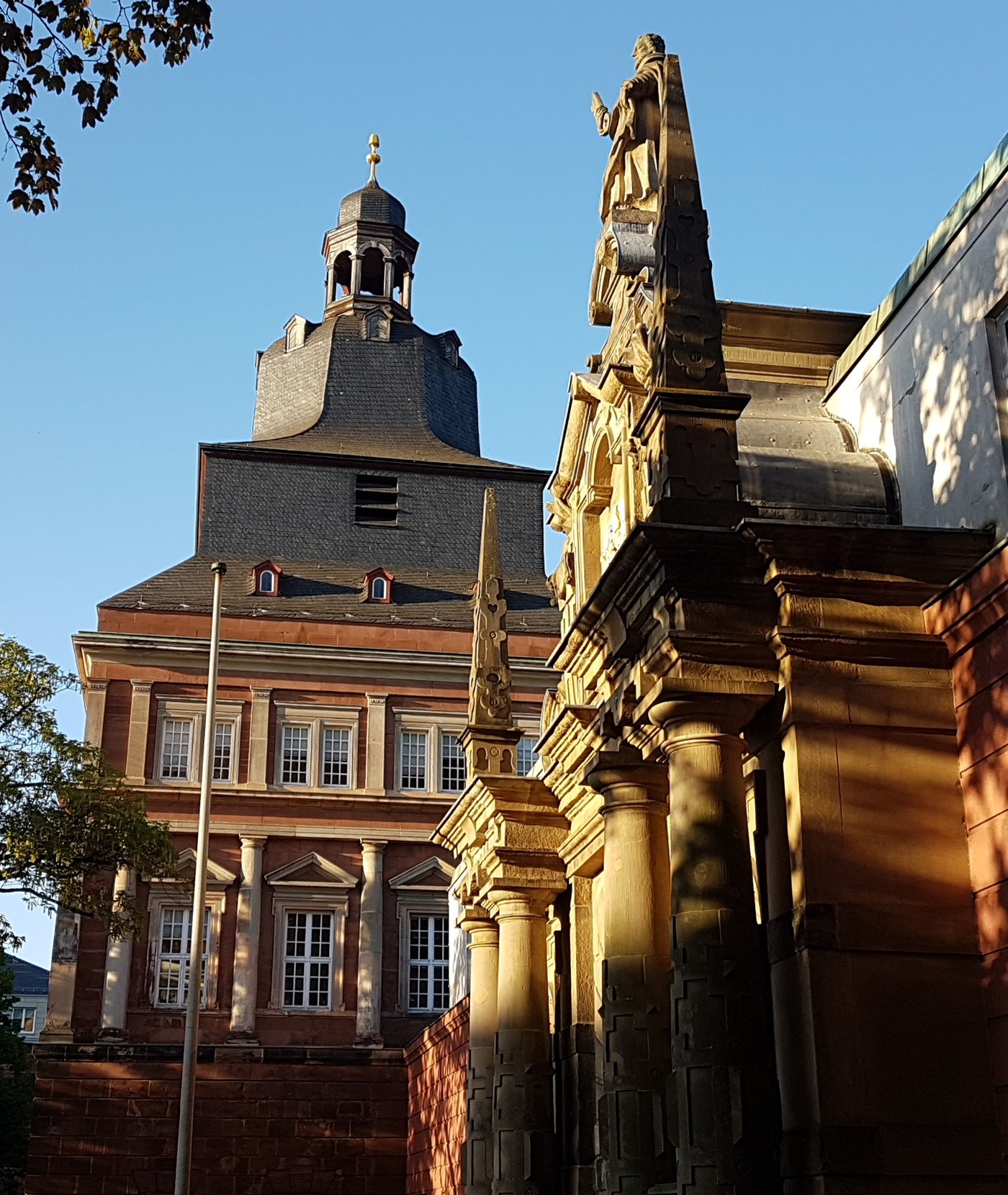
Detail tower and portal

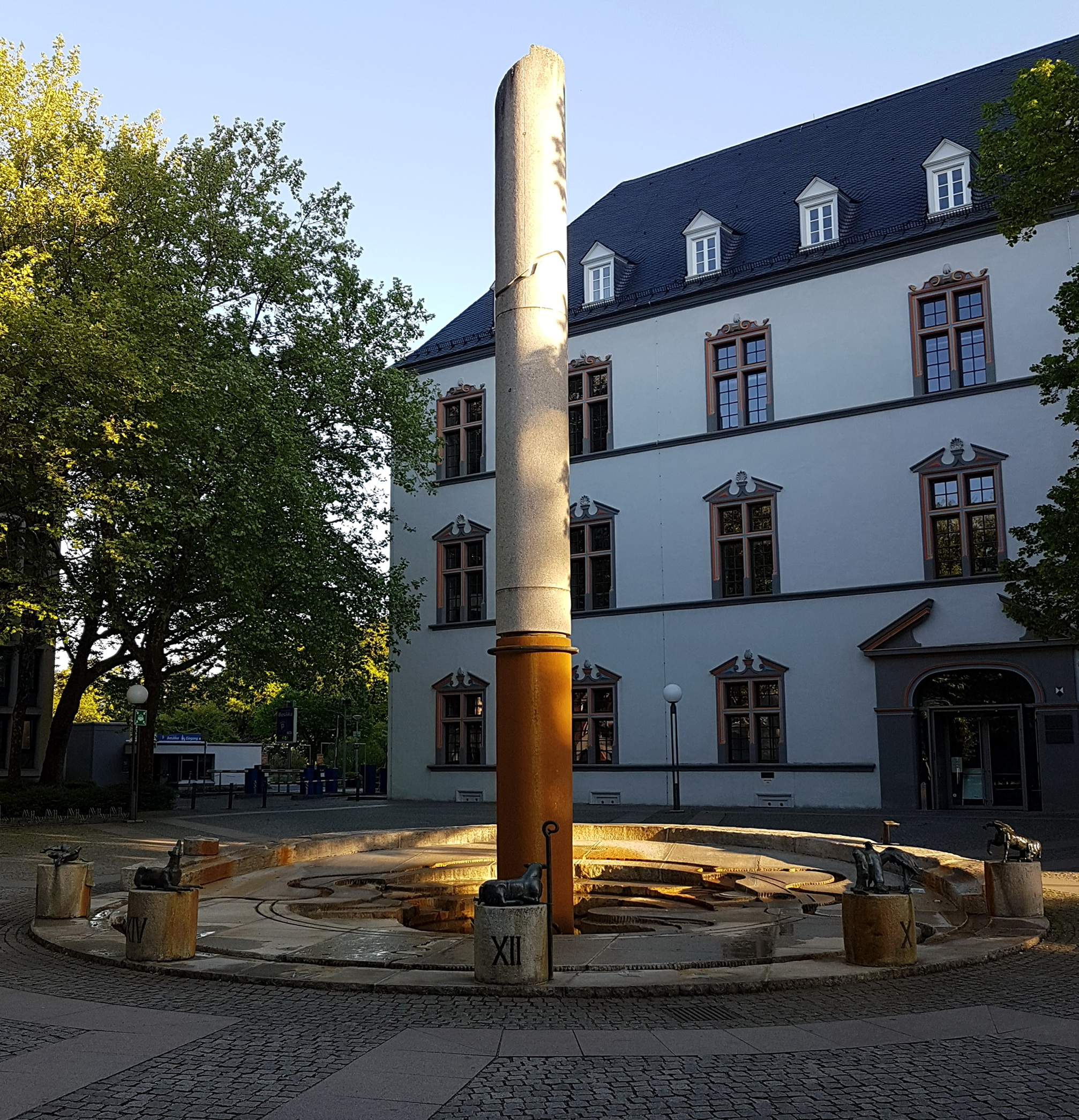
Willy-Brandt-Platz

=== Exterior Hochschloss ===
The Hochschloss consists of three wings built in a mix of architectural styles: Renaissance, Baroque and Rococo. In the 19th century the westernmost bays of the south wing were demolished in order to reveal the south façade of the Basilica. As a result the south wing of the palace is no longer symmetrical. Only the central part is in Rococo style. Somewhat odd is the overlap between the severe brick architecture of the Late Roman Basilica and the decorative Baroque and Rococo architecture of the adjacent building.

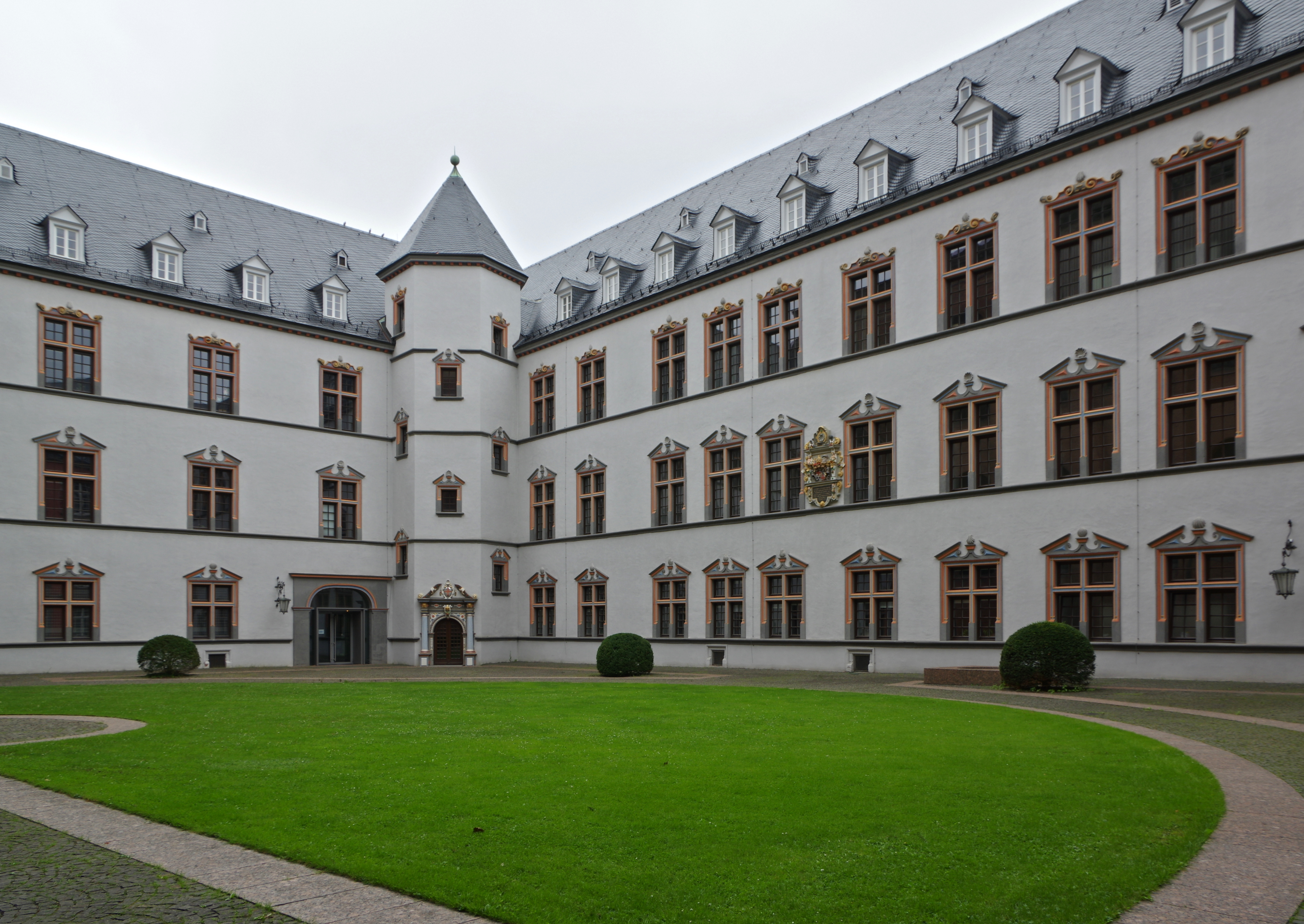
Courtyard with north and east wing

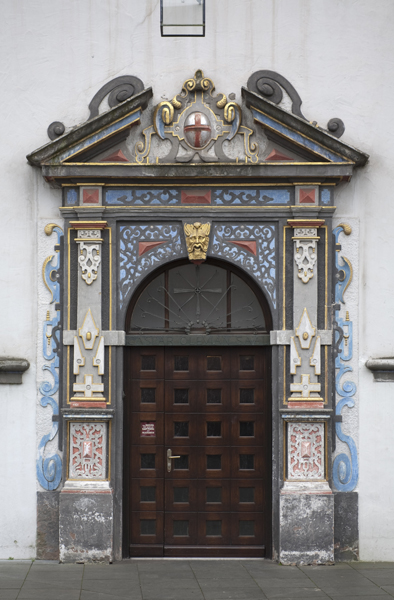
North wing: Renaissance door

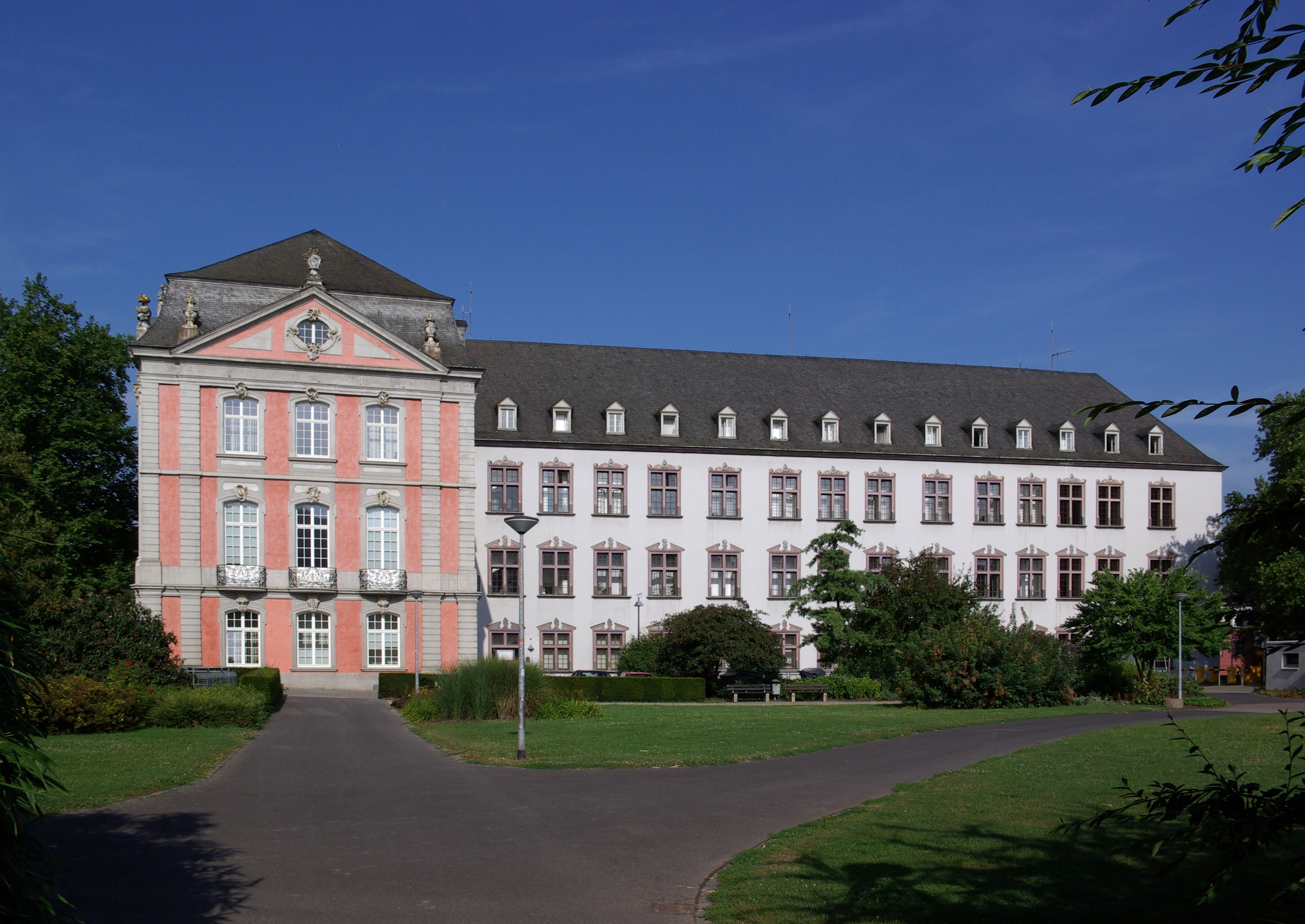
East wing and part of the south wing

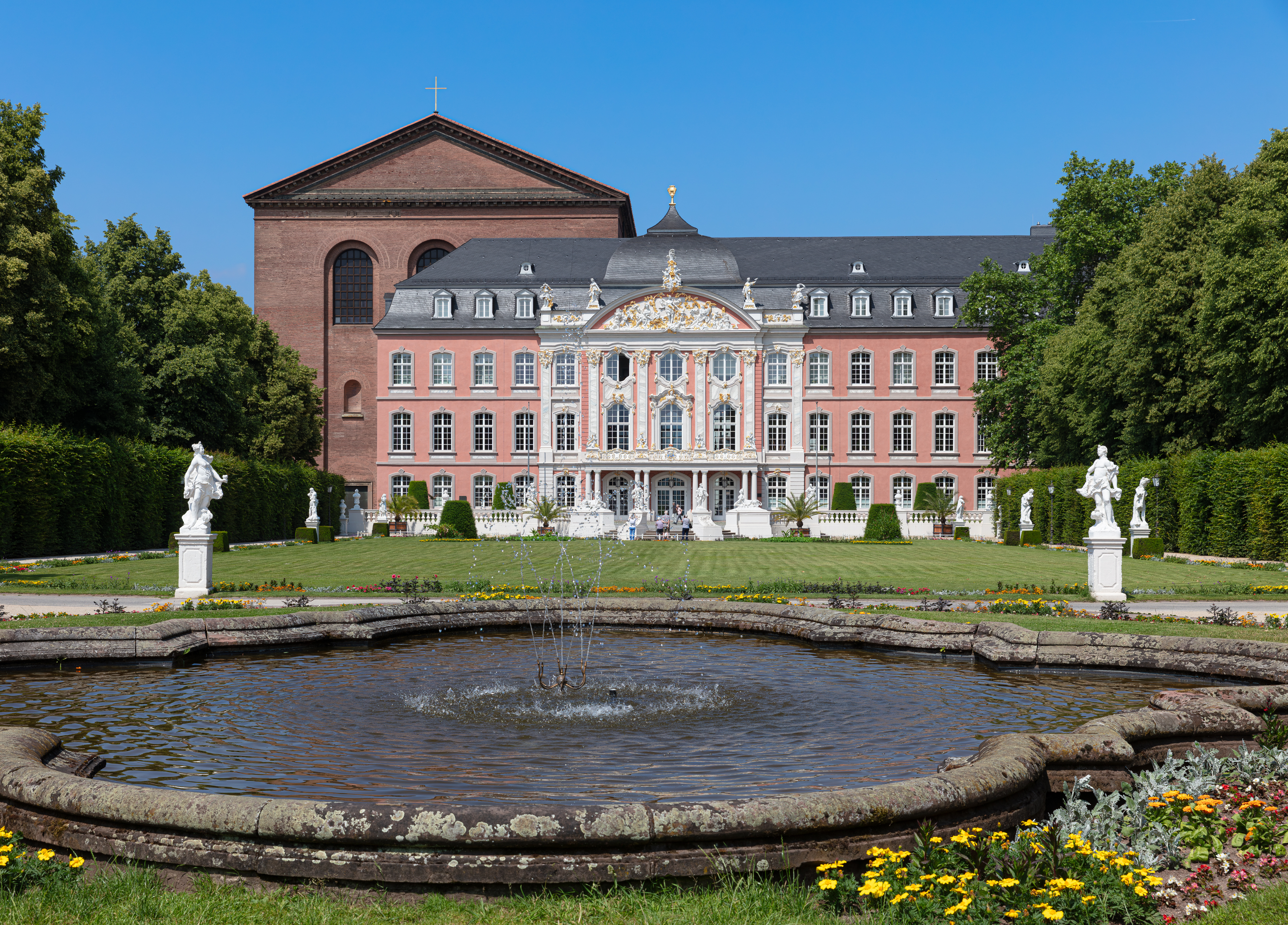
South façade

=== Interior south wing ===
The famous Rococo staircase is the main reason why the south wing was not demolished in its entirety. Despite severe war damage, the precious stair is still in situ and was restored after WW II. The stucco on the walls of the staircase was added around 1906, because the originals were lost since early 19th. century. The paintings on the walls and on the ceilings of the staircase and the next room are no historical remains, they were added in the 1970s.

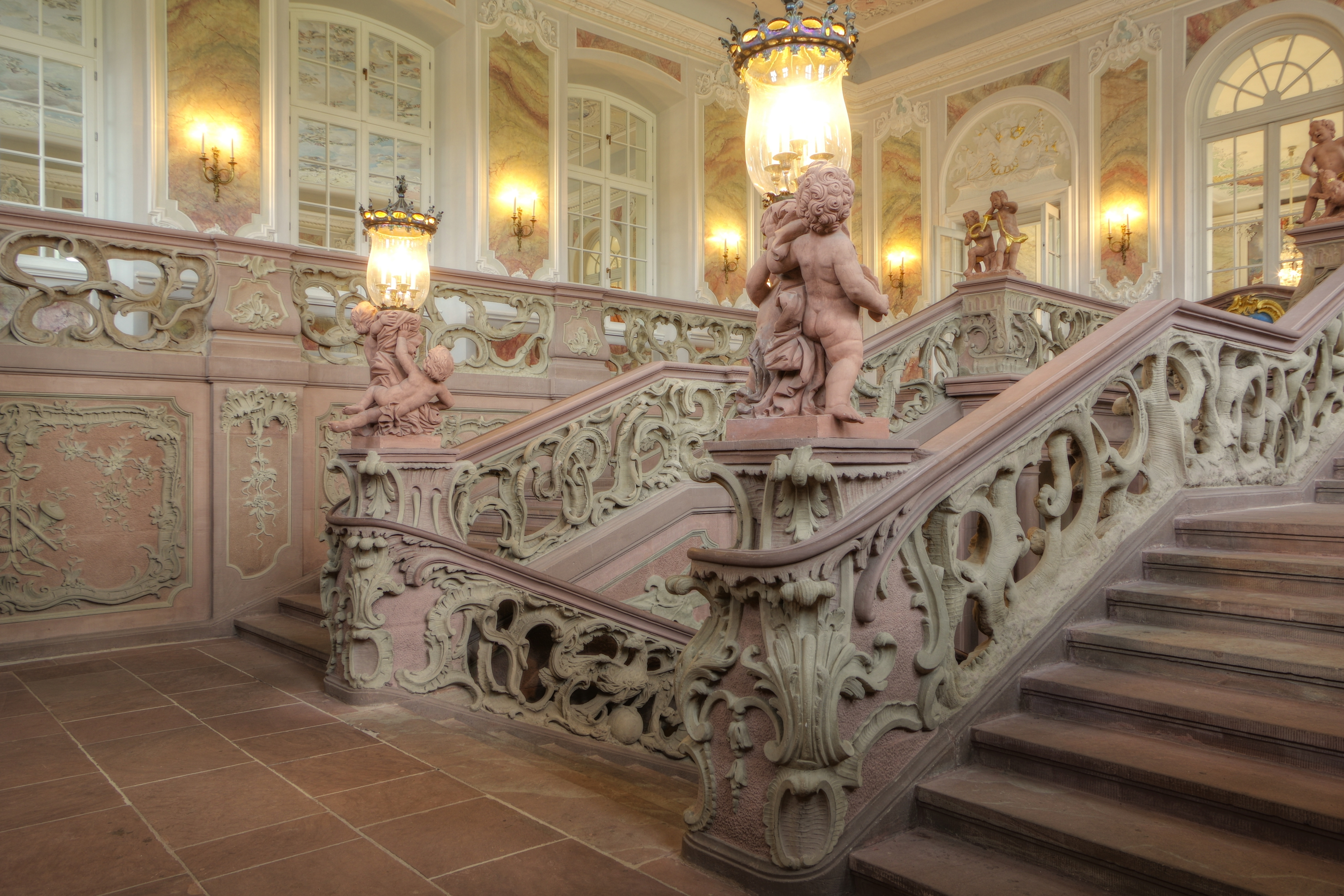
Staircase

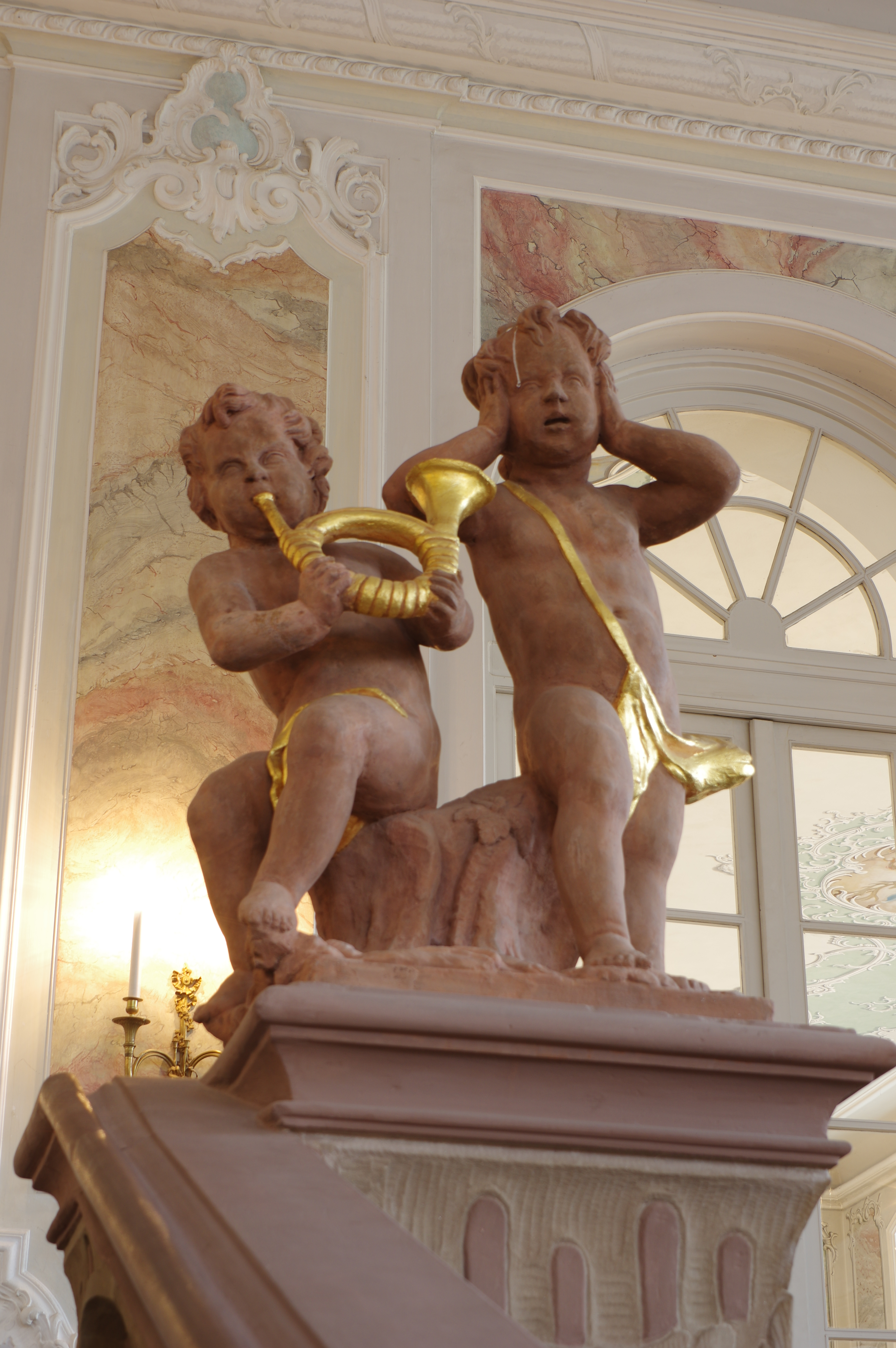
Detail staircase

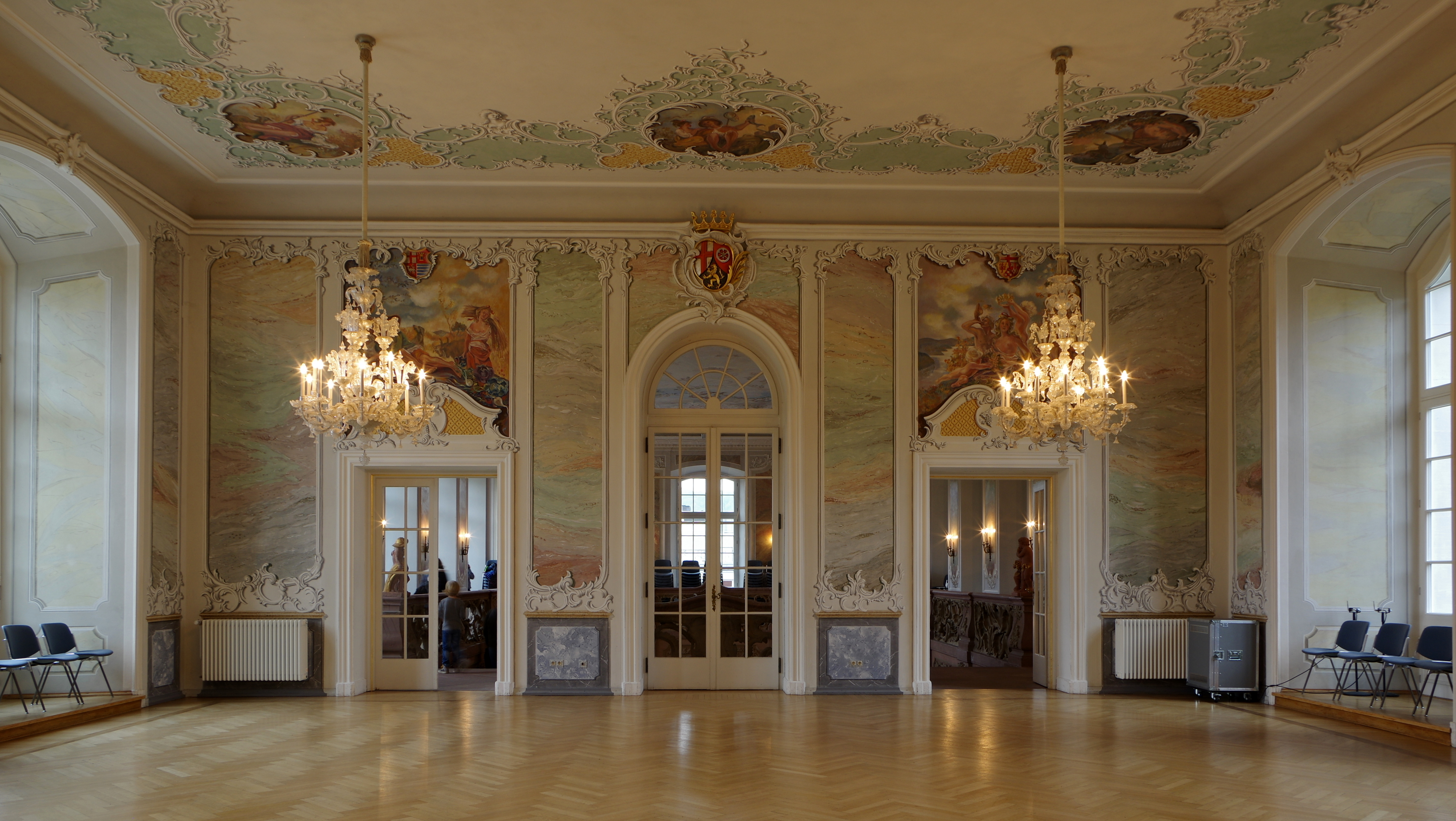
Reception hall

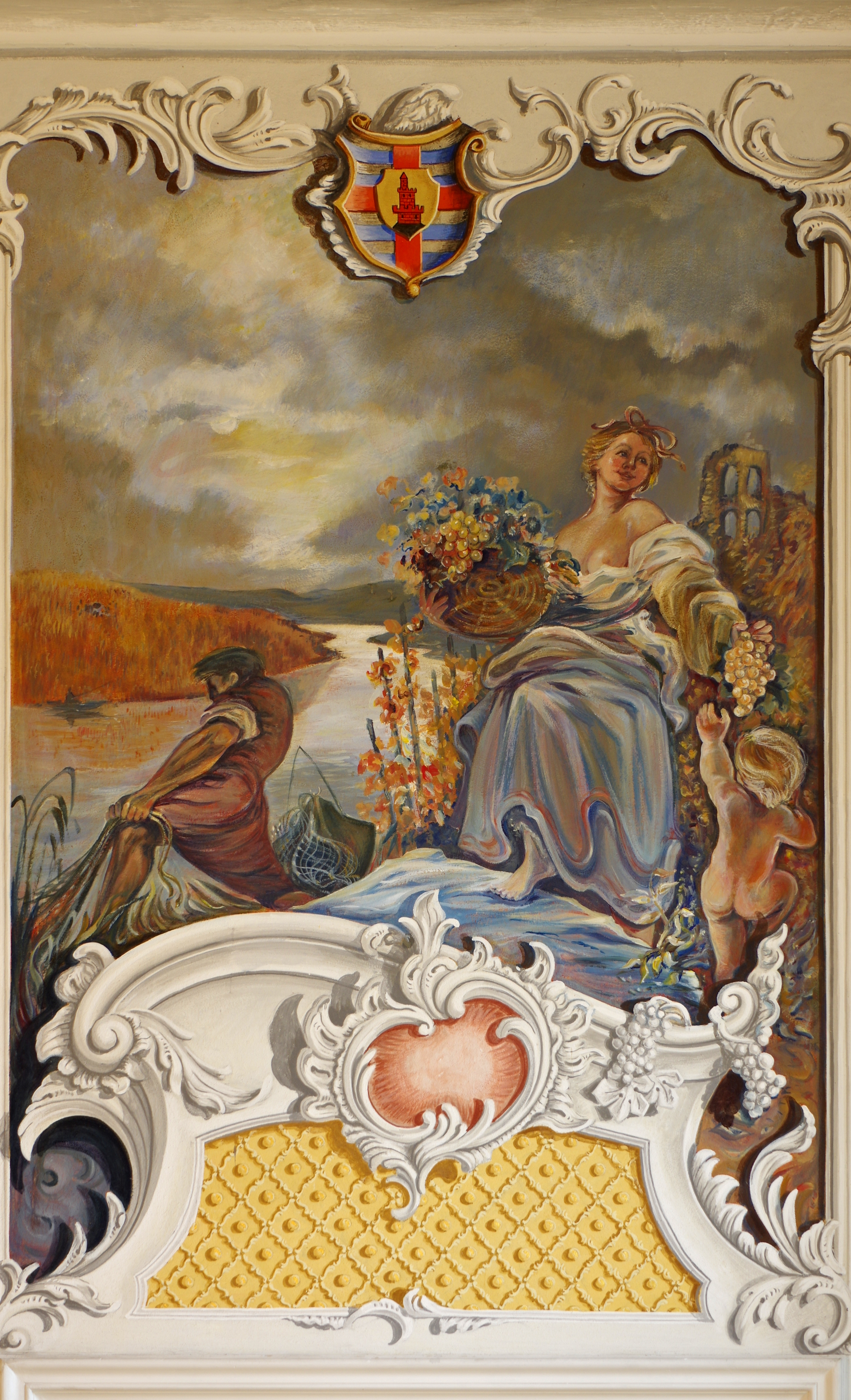
Detail reception hall

=== Palace garden ===
Since the early 20th century the former palace gardens have been open to the public. A notable feature are the garden statues by Ferdinand Tietz. Some of the more frivolous ones seem at odds with the former ecclesiastic purpose of the palace.

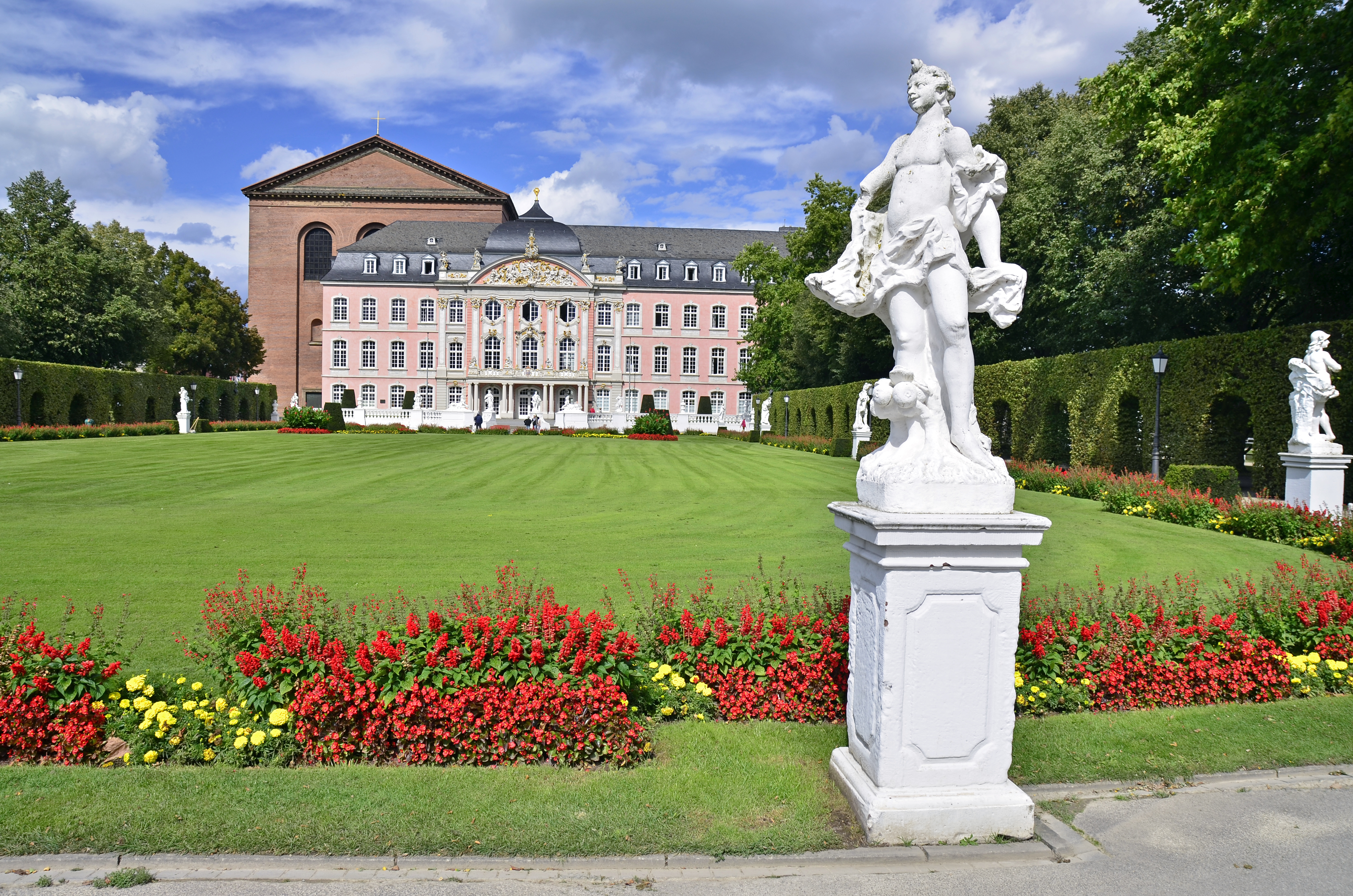
Garden statues by Tietz

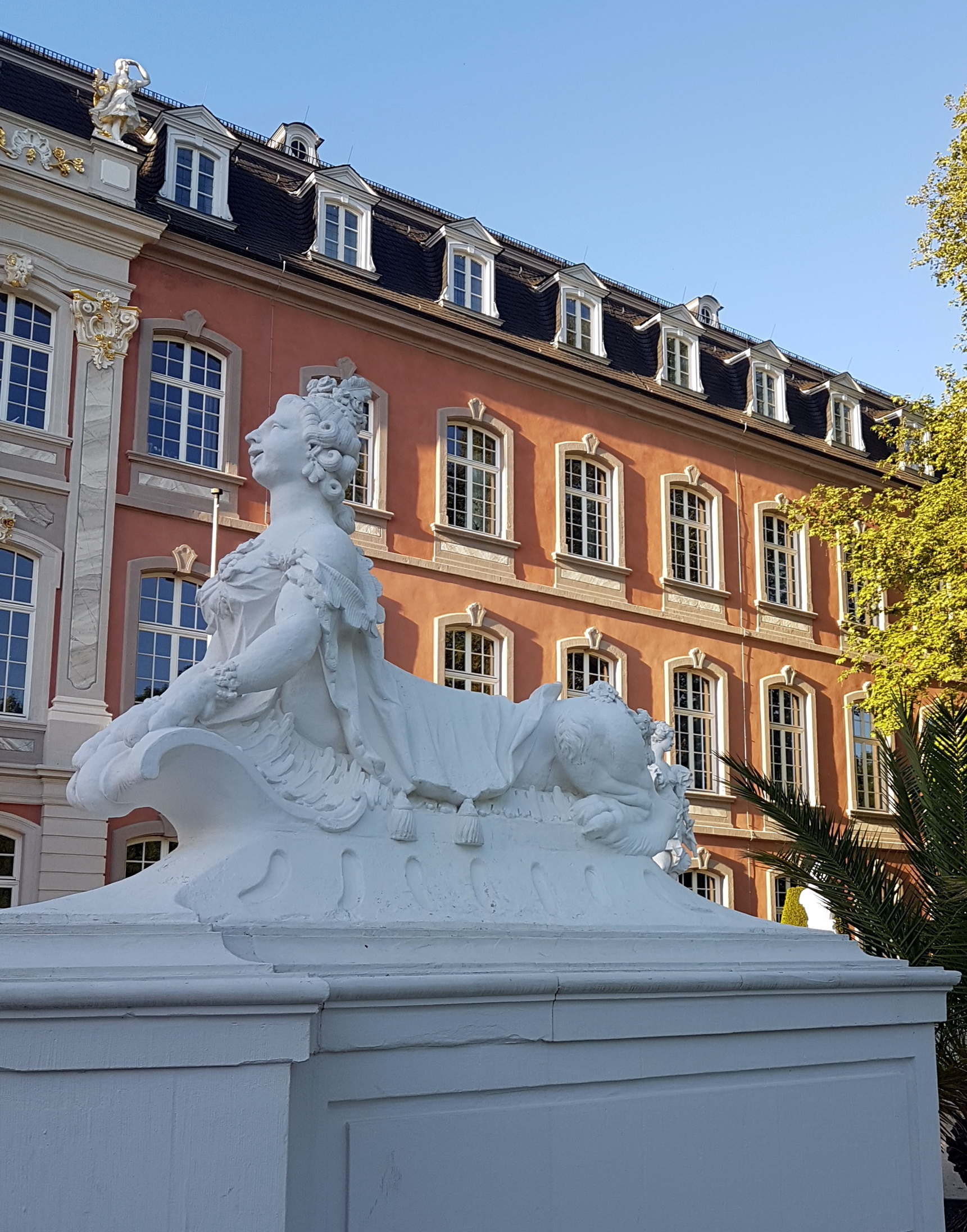
Terrace stairs, sphinx

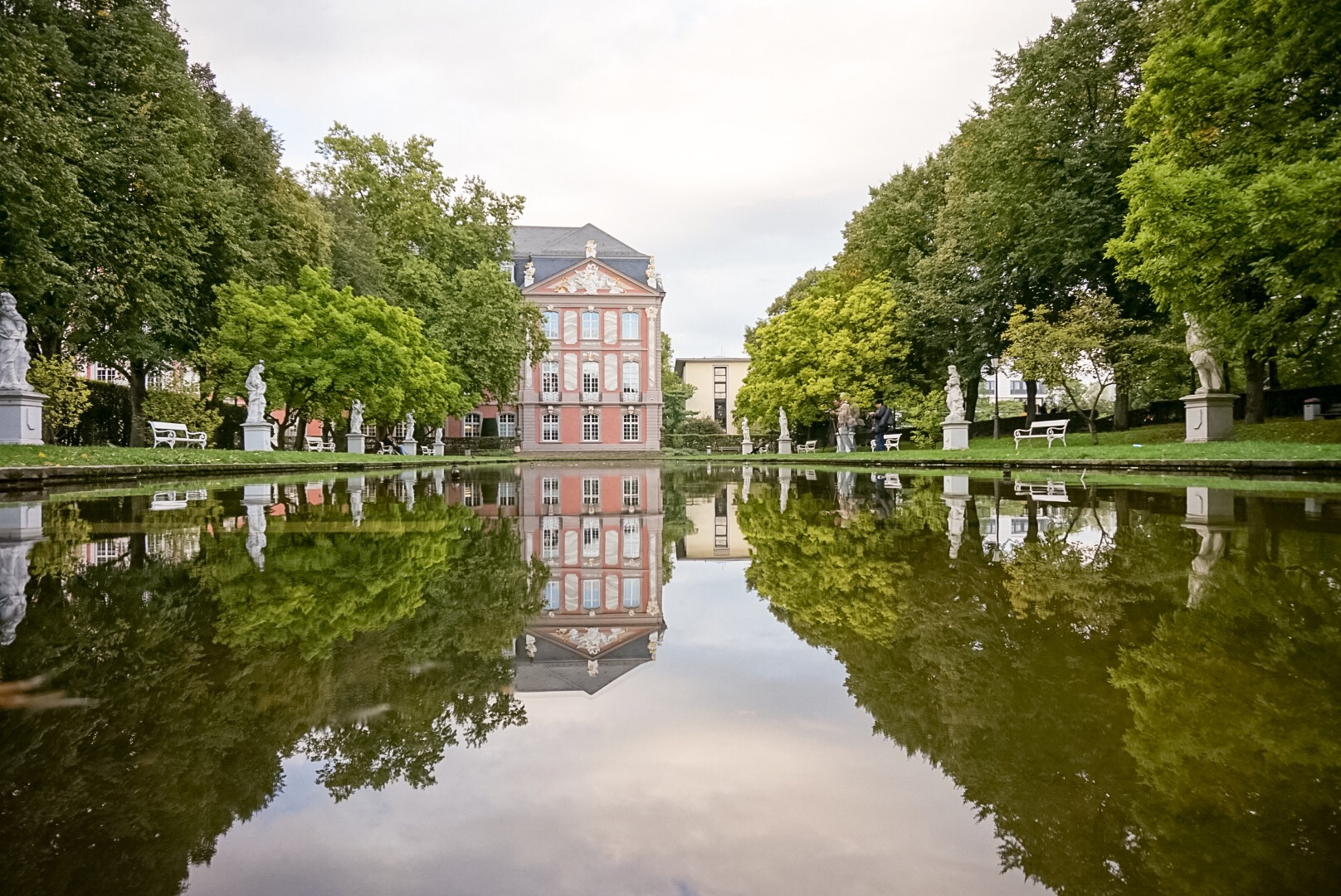
Main pond with statues

Fountains display

== See also ==
Other palaces, residences and hunting lodges of the Prince-Electors of Trier:

- Electoral Palace, Koblenz
- The yellow castle of Montabaur
- Schloss Engers
- Schloss Kärlich
- Schloss Philippsburg (Koblenz)
- Schloss Philippsfreude
- Schloss Schönbornslust
