= Dietrich Flade =

German lawyer and judge (died 1589)

Dietrich Flade (c. 1534 – 18 September 1589) was a German lawyer and judge who became one of the best-known victims of the Trier witch trials. He presided over at least eight trials as a judge until he, too, was arrested and executed for witchcraft.

== Early life and political career ==
Flade, born around 1534, was the son of Trier's town crier. He studied law and married a woman from a respected family. By 1559, he was an electoral councillor, or an advisor to the Electorate of Trier's government. That year saw Flade support the suppression of Trier's Protestant faction, led by Caspar Olevian, and their attempts to gain greater autonomy for Trier as a city.

In 1580, Trier's municipal government petitioned the Aulic Council to challenge the authority of Jakob von Eltz-Rübenach, Archbishop-Elector of Trier. If successful, the suit would have resulted in Trier becoming an imperial city, thus gaining independence from its elector. Flade supported Eltz-Rübenach in challenging the expensive legal suit, which ended in the municipal government losing and entering a period of economic depression.

Flade, however, was rewarded for his loyalty with appointments as a municipal judge and vice-governor of Trier. Trier's governor, Johann Zandt von Merl, quickly viewed Flade as a political rival.

During the early 1580s, Flade used his wealth to loan money to peasant farmers who had experienced crop failures. He subsequently developed a reputation for profiteering from the poverty of those who borrowed from him, and was described as "notoriously avaricious" by Johann von Schönenberg, who succeeded Eltz-Rübenach as Trier's elector. In 1586, he became rector of the University of Trier.

== Accusations of witchcraft ==
Trier experienced financial troubles in the early 1580s, partly due to crop failures and partly due to expenses incurred by the municipality during its suit against Archbishop-Elector Eltz-Rübenach. During this period of unrest, the city hosted successive witch hunts from 1581 to 1593, known as the Trier witch trials.

In early 1587, a teenage boy named Matthias underwent an exorcism after confessing to sorcery. According to Trier's governor Zandt, Matthias described encountering Flade at a Witches' Sabbath. Between July and October of that year, at least three different alleged witches made similar accusations against Flade.

It is possible that these allegations were encouraged by Governor Zandt, owing to his and Flade's ongoing power struggle. Some historians posit that Flade was ultimately accused of witchcraft because he imposed more moderate sentences on accused witches than Zandt would have preferred. Nonetheless, in the 1990s, historian Johannes Dillinger found records of trials that Flade presided over which suggest Flade was a "keen witch hunter". Indeed, surviving records suggest that Flade sentenced at least eight women to death for witchcraft, and attempted to force the women to confess.

Rumours of Flade's alleged involvement in witchcraft spread throughout Trier, but Flade would not act until April 1588, when a woman named Margarethe von Euren similarly testified that she had encountered him at a Witches' Sabbath. She alleged that Flade had beaten her for refusing to participate in cursing local crops. Flade sought permission from Governor Zandt to send three friends to question Margarethe, but she maintained her story so strongly that one of Flade's friends was unwilling to dismiss her entirely, stating: "[It] seemed as if the Devil spoke out of her".

== Arrest, trial, and execution ==
By September 1588, Flade was the subject of twenty allegations. Among his accusers were alleged witches who also owed Flade money. Flade attempted to flee Trier in October, but was prevented from doing so by local authorities. A second attempt to flee was thwarted when a mob followed him and forced him to seek refuge in a Trier cathedral. While in hiding, he made a written appeal to Archbishop-Elector Johann von Schönenberg, offering to donate his property and enter a monastic life.

On 14 January 1589, Archbishop-Elector Johann von Schönenberg consulted the University of Trier's theological faculty regarding the accusations made against Flade. He believed that Flade had only offered to donate assets due to a guilty conscience. By this time, twenty-three people who had been executed for witchcraft by various regional courts had named Flade as a witch. The theological faculty evaluated Flade's case and ultimately agreed with von Schönenberg's assessment.

Flade was arrested in April 1589, and his trial began in August. He confessed to the charges against him after being tortured, and was subsequently sentenced to death. He was publicly executed on 18 September 1589 by strangulation, after which his body was burnt.
