= Hans Ruprecht Hoffmann =

German sculptor and stonemason

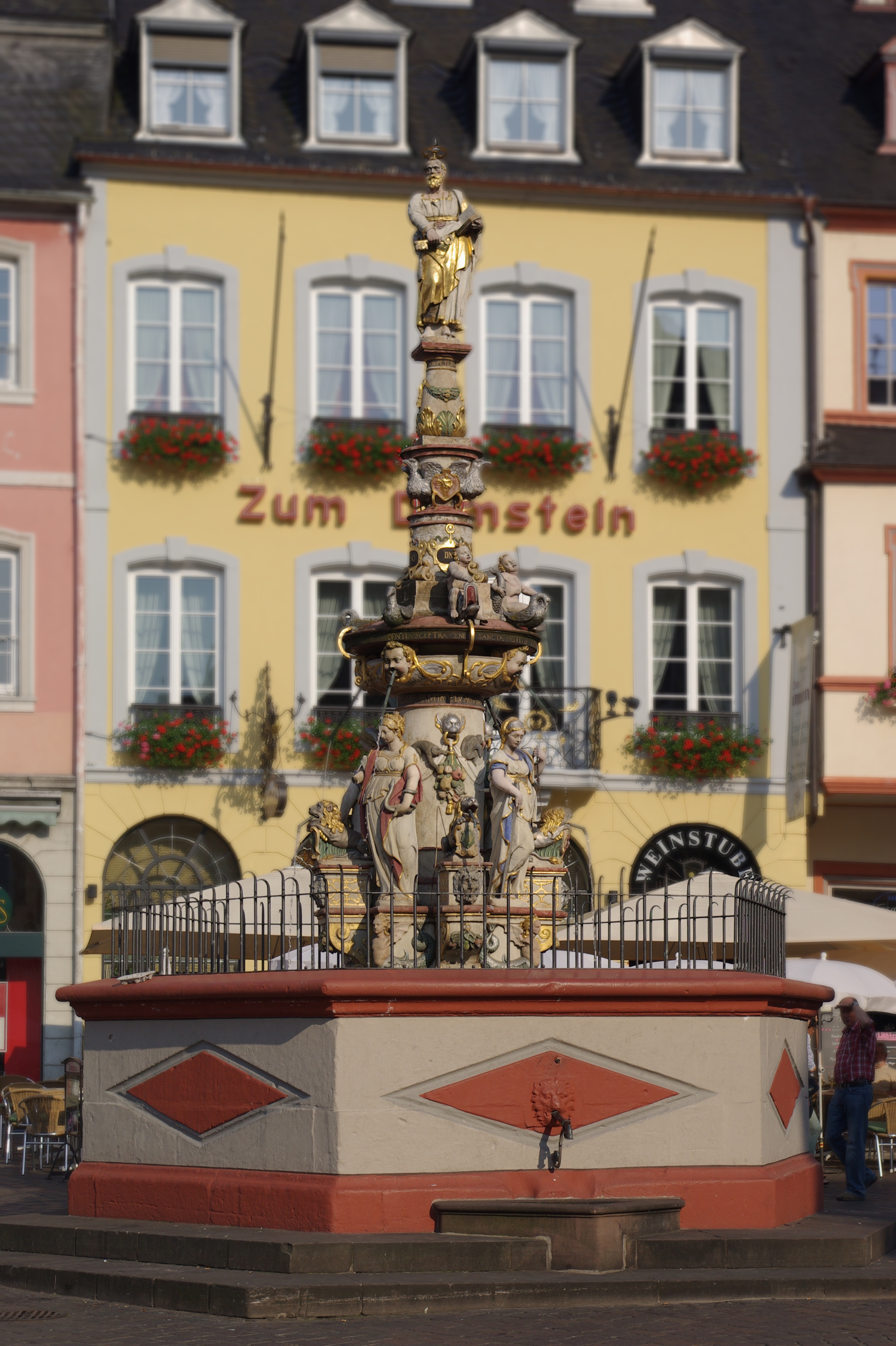
The Peter Fountain (1595) in Trier is one of Hoffman's best known works.

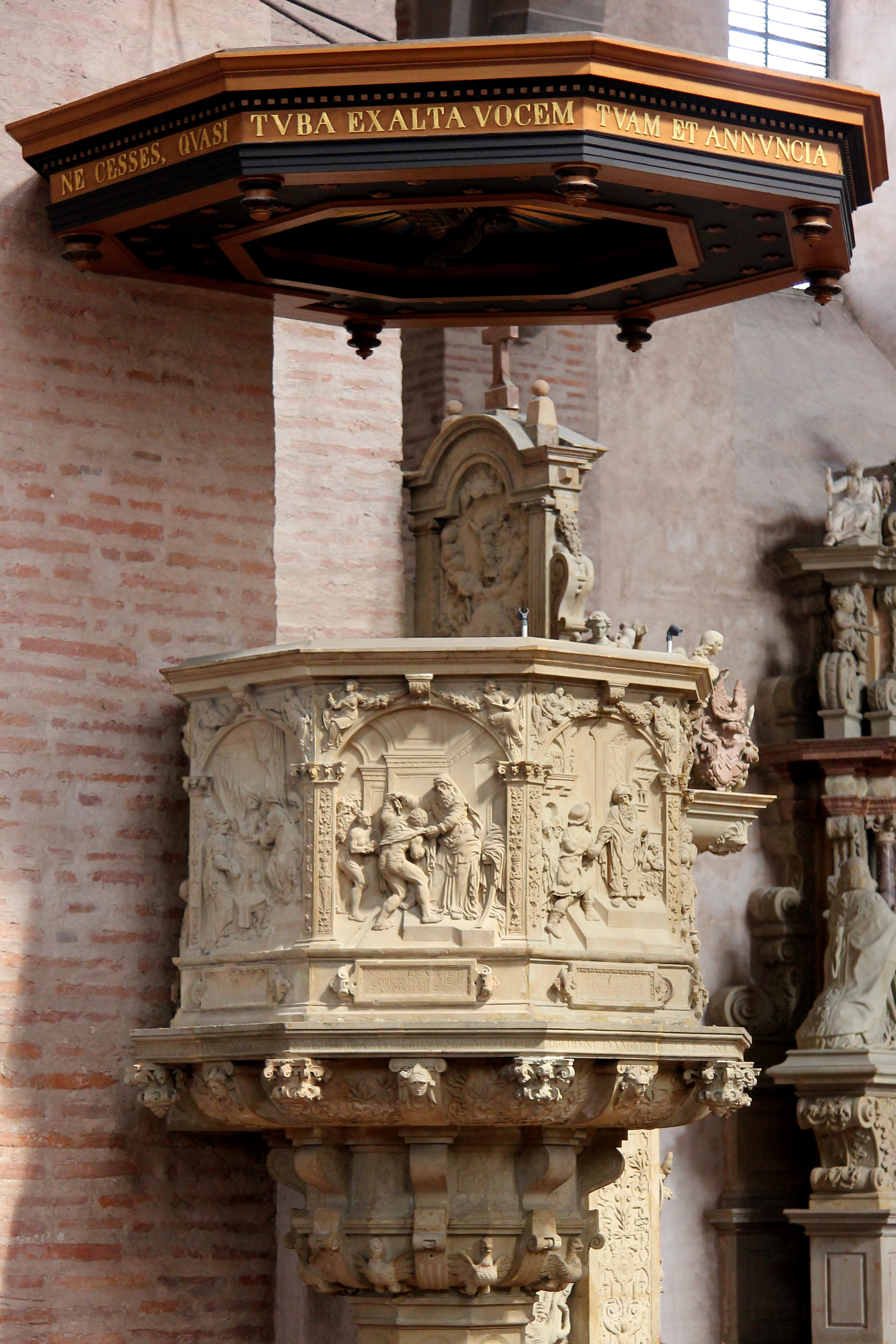
Pulpit in the cathedral of Trier

Hans Ruprecht Hoffmann (c. 1545–1617) was a German sculptor and master stonemason.

== Biography ==
Hans Ruprecht Hoffman was likely born in Worms around 1545. He apprenticed under Dietrich Schro in Mainz and Johann von Trarbach in Simmern. He became a master craftsman of the stonemason's guild. He established a large sculpture workshop and is noted for statues with particularly expressive faces.

He and his wife Katharina (d. 1582) had three children; in 1583, he married his second wife, Anna Örthin (d. 1589); and in 1590, his third wife, (Anna) Margaretha, daughter of Theis Kochenbecker of Cochem.

During his life, Hoffman was one of the leading proponents of Mannerism west of the Rhine. He is known for his epitaphs, altars, and funerary monuments, as well as the pulpit of the Cathedral of Trier and the Peter Fountain in Trier.

== Works ==
- Main Market Square, Trier:
  - Peter Fountain (1595)
- Cathedral of Trier:
  - Pulpit (1570–72)
  - Marble relief of altar in the cloister (1596)
  - Trinity Altar (1597) (at grave of Archbishop Jakob von Eltz-Rübenach)
  - St. John Altar (1601) (at grave of Archbishop Johann von Schönenberg)
  - All Saints Altar (1614) (at grave of Archbishop Lothar von Metternich)
- Liebfrauenkirche, Trier:
  - Grave altar of Hugo Schonenburg (d. 1581)
- Basilica of St. Salvator, Prüm:
  - Stone pulpit (before 1590)
