= Jean Delvaux =

Benedictine monk

Jean Delvaux (died on or after 2 April 1597) was a Benedictine monk of the Abbey of Stavelot who was executed as a practitioner of witchcraft.

== Life and witch trial ==
Delvaux was the son of peasants and as a child herded livestock in the Ardennes. He later claimed that at the age of 15 he was approached in the woods by an older man who promised him power and riches if he swore to follow his instructions. He stated that this man sent him to school in Trier and later told him that if he became a monk he would be able to exercise authority over others, as well as initiating him into the practice of witchcraft and giving him a devil's mark on his shoulders. Becoming a monk at Stavelot, Delvaux was initially successful in gaining minor offices within the community, but by 1592 had come under suspicion of covertly seeking to harm those in authority over him. The prior had him confined on a diet of bread and water, and after some time Delvaux began to declare that he had by witchcraft brought about the deaths of the previous prior, Antoine de Salm (d. 1591), and several other monks. When this was reported to Ernest of Bavaria, prince-bishop of Liège and nominal prince-abbot of Stavelot, he appointed André Streignart, the suffragan bishop of Liège, and Jean Chapeauville, vicar general of the diocese, to investigate Delvaux's case. Together with a notary they travelled to Stavelot and took down a formal statement from Delvaux, who claimed to have taken part in multiple gatherings of witches with at least 500 others, naming several local notables and clergy as fellow attendees.

After Delvaux's statements had been reported to Ernest, the prince-bishop in December 1595 appointed a four-member inquisitorial witchcraft tribunal consisting of Streignart and Chapeauville as ecclesiastical members together with the prince's chancellor, Pierre Oranus, and public prosecutor, Jean Malempeter, as jurists. The four set off for Stavelot in January 1596, their carriage breaking down along the way. Leaving the carriage in the care of their servants to be repaired, they continued on horseback, and when first confronting Delvaux he told them that the demon that had caused their carriage to break down was not his demon, but a different one. When questioned he again named many others as members of eight different covens spread across the region, claiming that they met at various locations at night, under the aegis of Beelzebub, Leviathan and Astaroth, who as a monastic succubus took the form of Venus. After making obeisance to their demonic lords, they would banquet on misappropriated food, dance, and engage in lewd acts with both men and women and a goat. At the end of their meetings, each would receive poison from Beelzebub with which to do harm, and it was by this means that he had caused the deaths of several fellow monks, including the former prior. One person he named as prominent among those attending the witches' sabbaths was Dietrich Flade, who had been executed as a witch in Trier in 1589. Chapeauville later wrote that both he and Oranus had privately visited Delvaux in his cell to try to convince him that his allegations could not all be true, and that at least some must be the product of a diabolically deluded imagination, but Delvaux insisted upon their veracity.

The investigation lasted until 10 January 1597, and as the judges began to question those named by Delvaux as participants in the covens, it was widely said that Delvaux was a madman whose assertions could not be believed. On 19 March the judges declared that Delvaux would be questioned again, with the threat of torture and under torture, but they found that his confessions and accusations remained consistent and coherent, which they saw as incompatible with insanity. On 2 April Delvaux was stripped of his monastic and clerical status as punishment for his self-confessed consorting with demons, and was handed over to the secular authorities, in the persons of Oranus and Malempeter, who sentenced him to be executed as a poisoner. Delvaux showed deep remorse, in light of which, and of the fact that he had already been incarcerated for five years, his execution was not by burning and he was allowed to be buried in the monastic graveyard. Before the execution was carried out, he asked the prior that after his death a dole of bread be made to the poor so that they should pray that his soul might find mercy.
