= 1619 imperial election =

1619 election in the Holy Roman Empire

- 28 August 1619

7 prince-electors 4 votes needed to win
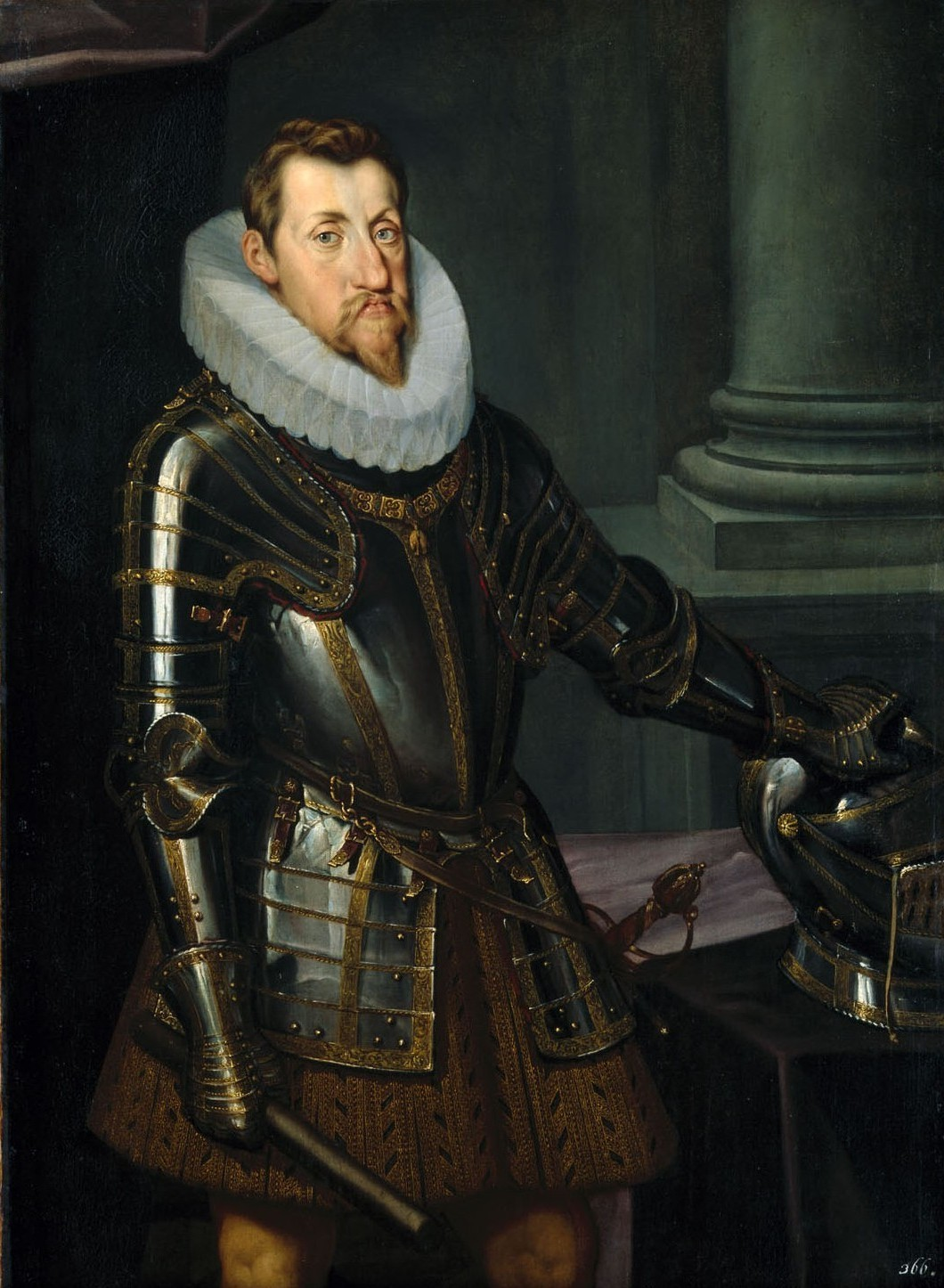
Candidate	Ferdinand II
House	Habsburg
Electoral vote	7
Percentage	100%
Emperor before election
Matthias
House of Habsburg
Elected Emperor
Ferdinand II
House of Habsburg

An imperial election, held to select the emperor of the Holy Roman Empire, took place in Frankfurt on 28 August 1619. It occurred against the backdrop of religious division in Europe, with Ferdinand, King of Bohemia, being forced from that position by a popular protestant revolt. The death of the Emperor Matthias emboldened the Bohemians estates, who hoped that the protestant Frederick V of the Palatinate (who they had offered the Bohemian crown to) could be elected instead of Ferdinand. However, all the electors apart from the Palatine supported Ferdinand (in part, hoping to restrict the conflict to Bohemia), and he was eventually elected as Ferdinand II, Holy Roman Emperor.

Despite the electors' efforts, the election would ultimately lead to the Thirty Years' War, one of the most destructive conflicts in European history.

== Background ==
This was the sixth imperial election to take place during the Reformation. On 31 October 1517, Martin Luther, a professor of moral theology at the University of Wittenberg, now part of the Martin Luther University of Halle-Wittenberg, had delivered the Ninety-five Theses to Albert of Brandenburg, the elector of Mainz. This list of propositions criticized the practice of selling indulgences, remissions of the punishment meted out for sin in Purgatory. Luther's criticism snowballed into a massive schism in the church, and from there into a split among the states of the empire. By 1600, the elector of the Electoral Palatinate was Calvinist and the electors of Saxony and Brandenburg were Lutheran.

=== Bohemian Revolt ===
Rudolf II, Holy Roman Emperor, Holy Roman Emperor and king of Hungary and Bohemia, was Catholic. In 1600 he was engaged in the Long Turkish War, which had drained the resources of his kingdoms and of the empire since 1593. On 28 December 1604, following military reverses and an economic crisis in Hungary, the Hungarian nobleman Stephen Bocskai launched a revolt. The Bocskai uprising lasted until 1606 and put additional pressure on Rudolf's resources. It was in this situation that Rudolf was forced to grant the Letter of Majesty in 1609, allowing the free practice of Protestant religions in Bohemia and creating a Bohemian Protestant state church run by the Protestant estates.

In 1617, Matthias, Holy Roman Emperor, by now Holy Roman Emperor and king of Hungary and Bohemia, arranged for the election of Ferdinand II, Holy Roman Emperor as his successor in Bohemia under the terms of the Oñate treaty. The fiercely Catholic Ferdinand II had suppressed Protestantism on his lands in Styria and had repudiated the Letter of Majesty. When, in 1618, Ferdinand II sent his representatives, Vilém Slavata of Chlum and Jaroslav Bořita of Martinice, to Prague to administer the government, they were thrown from the third floor of Prague Castle by members of the dissolved Protestant estates.

=== Election of 1619 ===
On 26 August 1619, the estates of Bohemia deposed Ferdinand II and elected Frederick V, elector Palatine, as king. Frederick accepted.

The Protestant plan was:

Protestants vote for Frederick V of the Palatinate and Bohemia: 4

- John George I, elector of Saxony
- John Sigismund, elector of Brandenburg
- Frederick V, as elector Palatine
- Frederick V, as king of Bohemia

Remaining Catholics vote for Ferdinand II: 3

- Johann Schweikhard von Kronberg, elector of Mainz
- Lothar von Metternich, elector of Trier
- Ferdinand of Bavaria, elector of Cologne

Frederick would have won 4 to 3.

Nonetheless, the other electors refused to hear an embassy of the Bohemian estates and confirmed Ferdinand II as Bohemian king and elector, with only the Palatine delegation objecting. The remaining five electors, who all voted for Ferdinand, were:

- Johann Schweikhard von Kronberg, elector of Mainz
- Lothar von Metternich, elector of Trier
- Ferdinand of Bavaria, elector of Cologne
- John George I, elector of Saxony
- John Sigismund, elector of Brandenburg

Ferdinand had a 6 to 1 advantage.

== Election results ==
Frederick, after casting a vote for Maximilian I, duke of Bavaria, retracted his vote and joined the other six electors in voting for Ferdinand II, who was crowned in Frankfurt on 9 September. Ferdinand was therefore elected unanimously. Either way, the end result was the Thirty Years War.

Elector	Electorate	Vote
Ferdinand of Bavaria	Cologne	Ferdinand II
Philipp Christoph von Sötern	Trier	Ferdinand II
Maximilian I	Bavaria	Ferdinand II
John George I	Saxony	Ferdinand II
Frederick V	Palatinate	Ferdinand II
Ferdinand II	Bohemia	Ferdinand II (voted for himself)
Lothar Franz von Schönborn	Mainz	Ferdinand II
Total		7 votes, 100% (unanimous)
