= Trier witch trials =

Witch trials (1581–1593) in the Holy Roman Empire

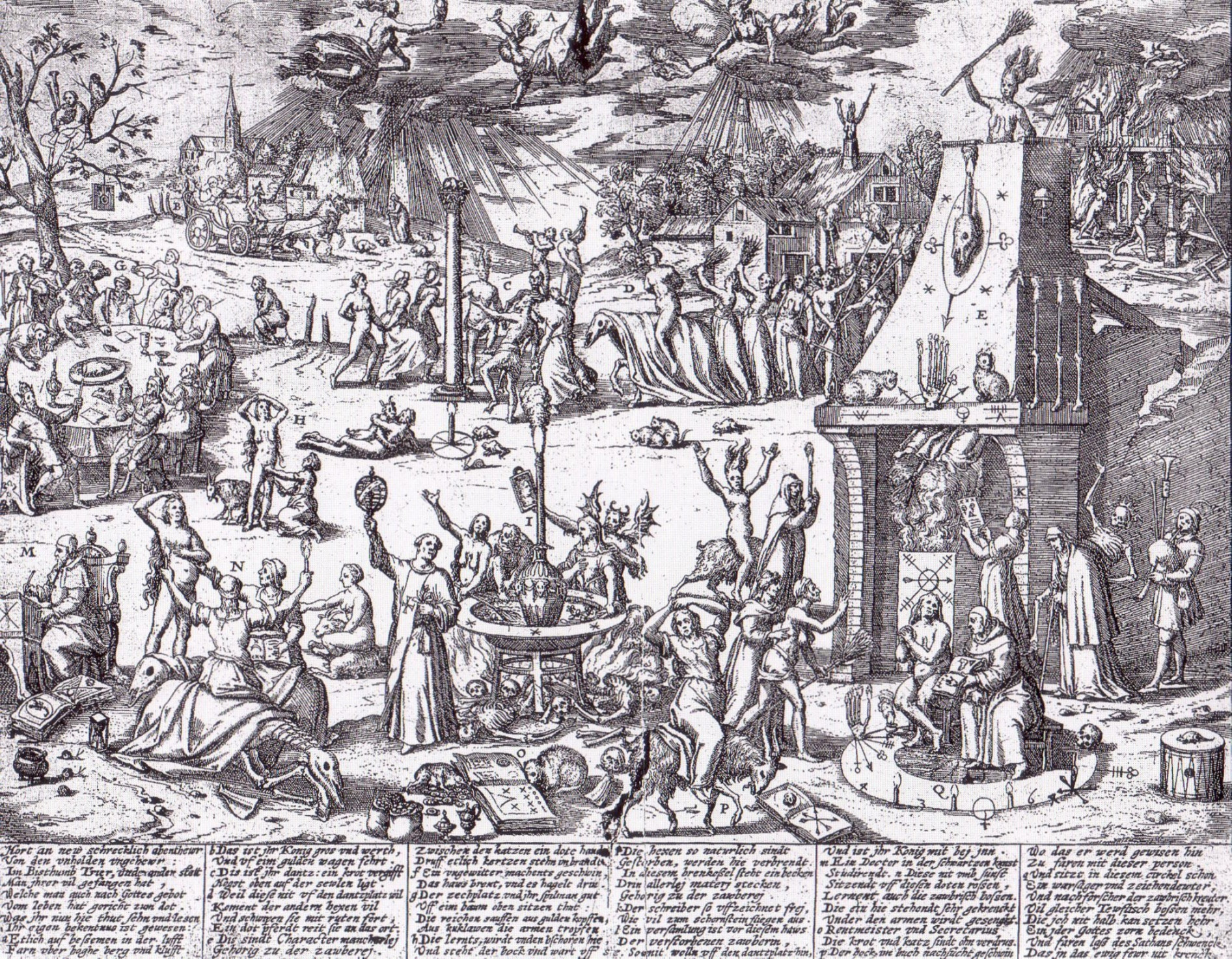
Trier witch trials (Pamphlett, 1594)

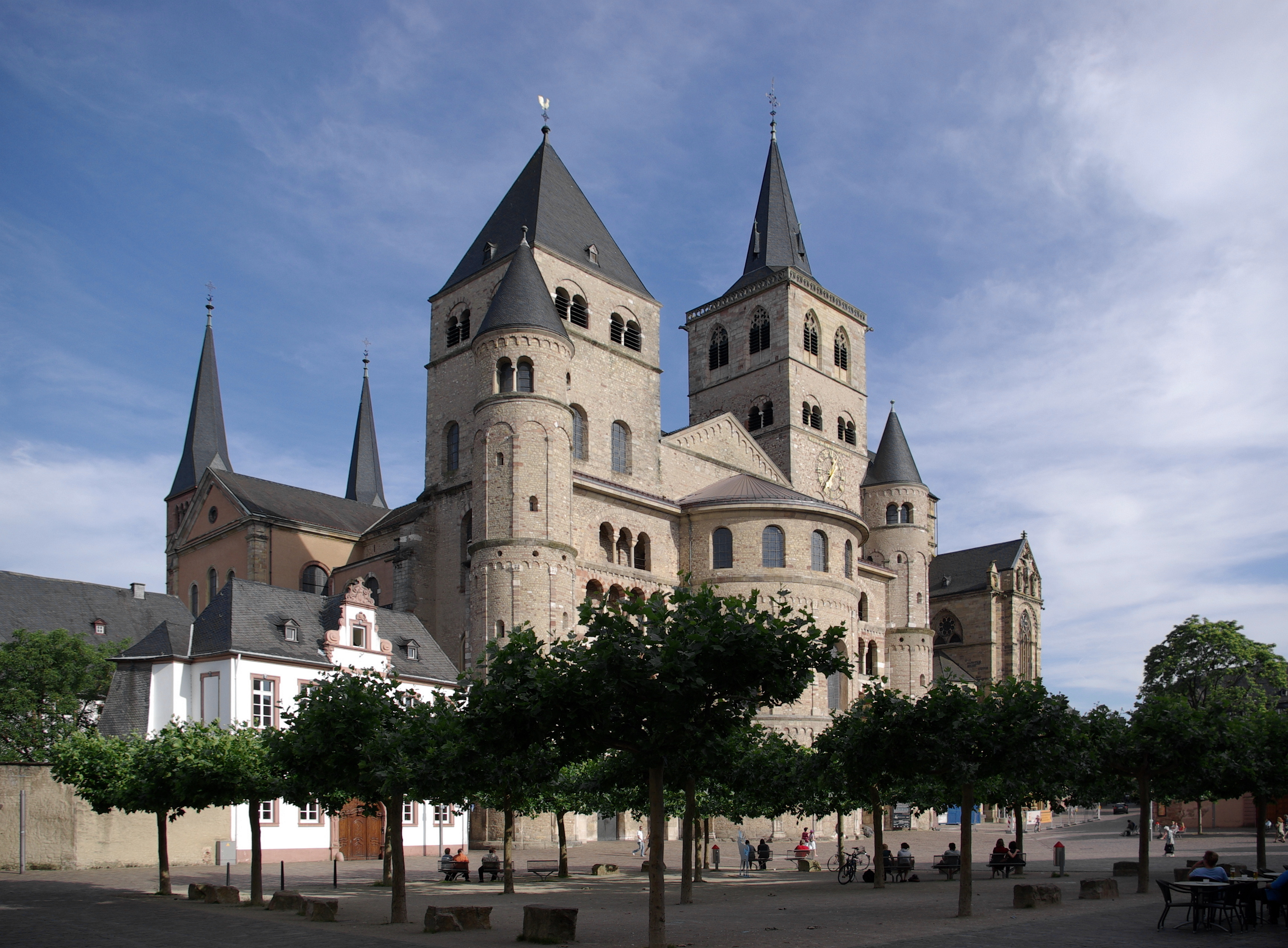
The Cathedral of Trier.

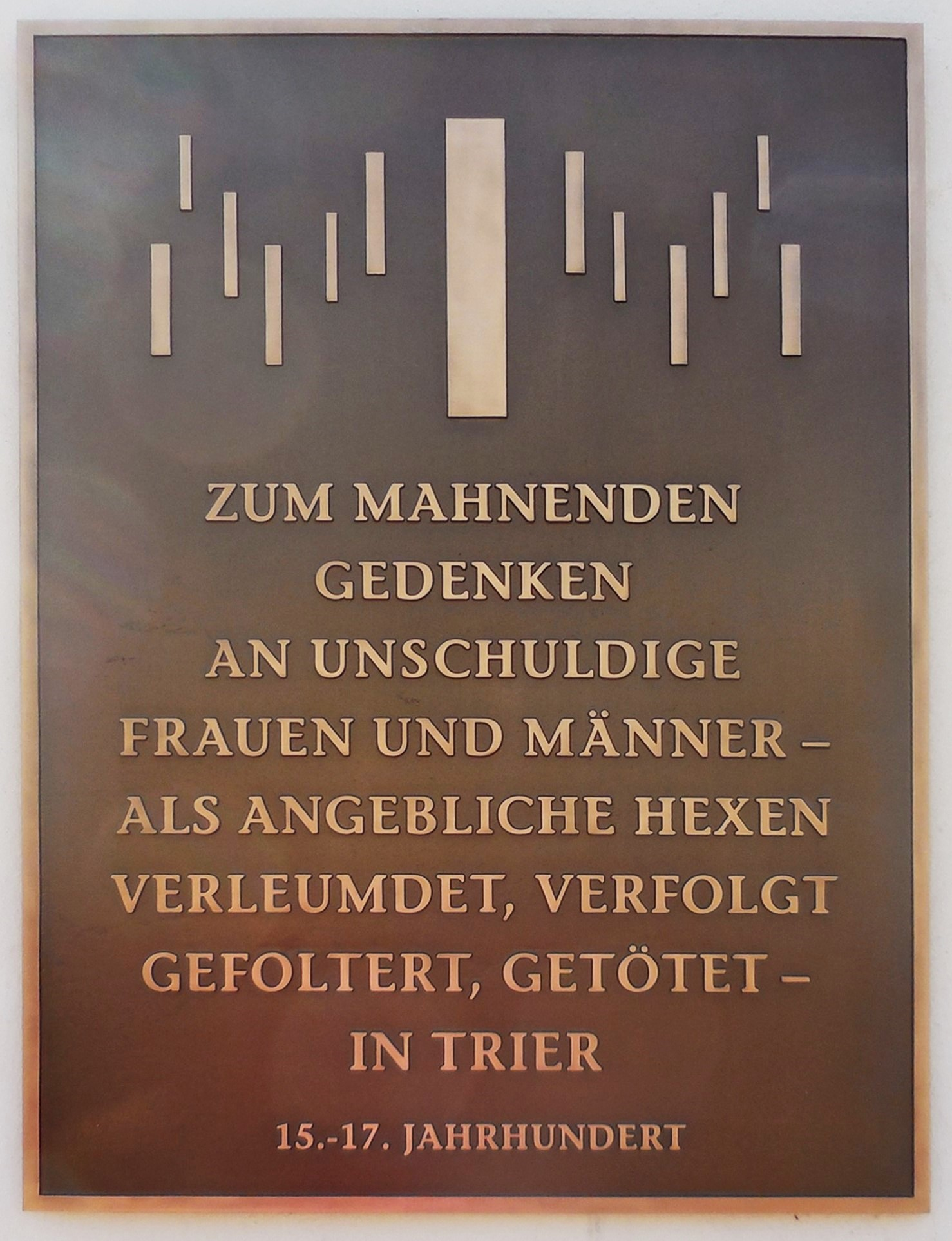
Memorial, 2015

The Witch Trials of Trier took place in the independent Roman Catholic diocese of Trier in the Holy Roman Empire in present-day Germany between 1581 and 1593, and were perhaps the largest documented witch trial in history in view of the executions. They formed one of the four largest witch trials in Germany alongside the Fulda witch trials, the Würzburg witch trials, and the Bamberg witch trials.

The persecutions started in the diocese of Trier in 1581 and reached the city itself in 1587, where they were to lead to the death of about 368 people - possibly the largest mass execution in Europe in peacetime. The number counts only those executed within the city itself, and the true number of executed people, counting everyone executed in all witch hunts within the whole diocese, was therefore even larger. The exact number of executions has never been established; a total of 1000 has been suggested but not confirmed.

== The witch trials ==
In 1581, Johann von Schönenberg was appointed archbishop of the independent diocese of Trier. Schönenberg greatly admired the order of the Jesuits to which he was "wonderfully addicted". He built them a college, and as a part of his efforts to demonstrate his convictions, he ordered the purging of three groups in society; first he rooted out the Protestants, then the Jews, and then the witches: three stereotypes of nonconformity. He was the one responsible for the massacres of Trier which, because of his initiative, support and patronage, became "of an importance quite unique in the history of witchcraft".

The beginning of the persecutions was later described by an eyewitness;

In as much as it was popularly believed that the continued sterility of many years was caused by witches through the malice of the Devil, the whole country rose to exterminate the witches. This movement was promoted by many in office, who hoped for wealth from the persecution. And so, from court to court throughout the towns and villages of all the diocese, scurried special accusers, inquisitors, notaries, jurors, judges, constables, dragging to trial and torture human beings of both sexes and burning them in great numbers. Scarcely any of those who were accused escaped punishment or were there spared even the leading men in the city of Trier. For the Judge, 2 with two Burgomasters, several Councilors and Associate Judges, canons of sundry collegiate churches, parish priests, rural deans, were swept away in this ruin. So far, at length, did the madness of the furious populace and of the courts go in this thirst for blood and booty that there was scarcely anybody who was not smirched some suspicion of this crime.

Between 1587 and 1593, 368 people were burned alive for sorcery in twenty-two villages, and in 1588, two villages were left with only one female inhabitant in each. People of both sexes, all ages and all classes, were victims; among the victims, 108 were men, women and children of the nobility, and also people with positions in the government and administration, including Dietrich Flade (a wealthy lawyer, city official, and judge, who had himself sentenced at least eight women to death for witchcraft). Flade, however, was granted the privilege of being stranged to death. His corpse was then burned and the ashes scattered far and wide.

Meanwhile notaries, copyists, and innkeepers grew rich. The executioner rode a blooded horse, like a noble of the court, and went clad in gold and silver; his wife vied with noble dames in the richness of her array. The children of those convicted and punished were sent into exile; their goods were confiscated; plowman and vintner failed-- hence came sterility. A direr pestilence or a more ruthless invader could hardly have ravaged the territory of Trier than this inquisition and persecution without bounds: many were the reasons for doubting that all were really guilty. This persecution lasted for several years; and some of those who presided over the administration of justice gloried in the multitude of the stakes, at each of which a human being had been given to the flames.

The mass executions caused the population to shrink, and the executioner prospered economically, described as riding about on a fine horse "like a nobleman of the court, dressed in silver and gold, while his wife vied with noblewomen in dress and luxury." At last, though the flames were still unsated, the people grew impoverished, rules were made and enforced restricting the fees and costs of examinations and examiners, and suddenly, as when in war funds fail, the zeal of the persecutors died out."

== The recantation of Loos ==
One of the people trying to protest against the mass hysteria was Cornelius Loos, a scholar of professorship in the university. Failing in his appeals to the authorities, he wrote a book to set forth his views, but the manuscript was confiscated and Loos arrested. He was brought out in the spring of 1593 to make a recantation before the assembled church dignitaries of the place. This recantation was preserved by the Jesuit priest Martin Anton Delrio, in Delrio's 1599-1600 treatise in support of the witch trials:

I, Cornelius Loosæus Callidius, born at the town of Gouda in Holland, but now (on account of a certain treatise On Trite and False Witchcraft, 1 rashly and presumptously written without the knowledge and permission of the superiors of this place, shown by me to others, and then sent to be printed at Cologne) arrested and imprisoned in the Imperial Monastery of St. Maximin, near Trier, by order of the Most Reverend and Most Illustrious Lord, the Papal Nuncio, Octavius, Bishop of Tricarico: whereas I am informed of a surety that in the aforesaid book and also in certain letters of mine on the same subject sent clandestinely to the clergy and town council of Trier, and to others (for the purpose of hindering the execution of justice against the witches, male and female), are contained many articles which are not only erroneous and scandalous, but also suspected of heresy and smacking of the crime of treason, as being seditious and foolhardy, against the common opinion of decisions and bulls of theological teachers and the decisions and bulls of the Supreme Pontiffs, and contrary to the practice and to the statutes and laws of the magistrates and judges, not only of this Archdiocese of Trier, but of other provinces and principalities, I do therefore revoke, condemn, reject, and repudiate the said articles, in the order in which they are here subjoined.

1. In the first place, I revoke, condemn, reject, and censure the idea (which both in words and writing I have often and before many persons pertinaciously asserted, and which I wished to be the head and front of this my disputation) that the things which are written about the bodily transportation or translation of witches, male and female, are altogether fanciful and must be reckoned the empty superstition; [and this I recant] both because it smacks of rank heresy and because this opinion partakes of sedition and hence savors of the crime of treason.

2. For (and this in the second place I recant), in the letters which I have clandestinely sent to sundry persons, I have pertinaciously, without solid reasons, alleged against the magistracy that the [aerial] flight of witches is false and imaginary; asserting, moreover, that the wretched creatures are compelled by the severity of the torture to confess things which they have never done, and that by cruel butchery innocent blood is shed and by a new alchemy gold and silver coined from human blood.

3. By these and by other things of the same sort, partly in private conversations among the people, partly in sundry letters addressed to both the magistracies, 1 I have accused of tyranny to their subjects the superiors and the judges.

4. And consequently, inasmuch as the Most Reverend and Most Illustrious Archbishop and Prince-Elector of Trier not only permits witches, male and female, to be subjected in his diocese to deserved punishment, but has also ordained laws regulating the method and costs of judicial procedure against witches, I have with heedless temerity tacitly insinuated the charge of tyranny against the aforesaid Elector of Trier.

5. I revoke and condemn, moreover, the following conclusions of mine, to wit: that there are no witches who renounce God, pay worship to the Devil, bring storms by the Devils aid, and do other like things, but that all these things are dreams.

6. Also, that magic (magia) ought not to be called witchcraft (maleficium), nor magicians (magi) witches (malefici), and that the passage of Holy Scripture, "Thou shalt not suffer a witch to live" (Maleficos non patieris vivere), 1 is to be understood of those who by a natural use of natural poisons inflict death.

7. That no compact does or can exist between the Devil and a human being.

8. That devils do not assume bodies.

9. That the life of Hilarion written by St. Jerome is not authentic.

10. That there is no sexual intercourse between the Devil and human beings.

11. That neither devils nor witches can raise tempests, rainstorms, hail-storms, and the like, and that the things said about these are mere dreams.

12. That spirit and form apart from matter cannot be seen by man.

13. That it is rash to assert that whatever devils can do, witches also can do through their aid.

14. That the opinion that a superior demon can cast out an inferior is erroneous and derogatory to Christ. 2

15. That the Popes in their bulls do not say that magicians and witches perpetrate such things (as are mentioned above).

16. That the Roman Pontiffs granted the power to proceed against witches, lest if they should refuse they might be unjustly accused of magic, just as some of their predecessors had been justly accused of it.

These assertions, all and singular, with many calumnies, falsehoods, and sycophancies, toward the magistracy, both secular and ecelesiastical, spitefully, immodestly, and falsely poured forth, without cause, with which my writings on magic teem, I hereby expressly and deliberately condemn, revoke, and reject, earnestly beseeching the pardon of God and of my superiors for what I have done, and solemnly promising that in future I will neither in word nor in writing, by myself or through others, in whatsoever place it may befall me to be, teach, promulgate, defend, or assert any of these things. If I shall do to the contrary, I subject myself thenceforward, as if it were now, to all the penalties of the law against relapsed heretics, recusants, seditious offenders, traitors, backbiters, sycophants, who have been openly convicted, and also to those ordained against perjurers. I submit myself also to arbitrary correction, whether by the Archbishop of Trier or by any other magistrates under whom it may befall me to dwell, and who may he certified of my relapse and of my broken faith, that they may punish me according to my deserts, in honor and reputation, property and person.

In testimony of all which I have, with my own hand, signed this my recantation of the aforesaid articles, in presence of notary and witnesses.

(Signed)

CORNELIUS LOOSÆUS CALLIDIUS.

(and attested)

Done in the Imperial Monastery of St. Maximin, outside the walls of Trier, in the abbot's chamber, in presence of the Reverend, Venerable, and Eminent Sirs, Peter Binsfeld, 1 Bishop of Azotus, vicar-general in matters spiritual of the Most Reverend Archbishop of Trier, our most element lord, and Reinerus, abbot of the said monastery, Bartholomæus van Bodeghem, of Delft, J. U. L., Official of the Ecclesiastical Court of Trier, Georgius von Helffenstein, Doctor of Theology, Dean of the Collegiate Church of St. Simeon in the city of Trier, and Joannes Colmann, J. U. D., Canon of the said church and Seal-Bearer of the Court of Trier, 2 etc., in the year of Our Lord 1592 more Trev., 3 on

== Aftermath and legacy ==
The Trier witch trials, due to their colossal size, attracted great attention in contemporary Europe. News pamphlets about them were published as far away as Denmark, reviving interest in witch trials and influencing the Copenhagen witch trials, which in turn were connected to the famous North Berwick witch trials.

== Sources ==
- "III. The Witch-Persecution at Trier". Internet Sacred Text Archive Home.
- "Online Library of Liberty". Online Library of Liberty.
- Alison Rowlands: Witchcraft Narratives in Germany: Rothenburg, 1561–1652, Manchester University Press (2003); ISBN 978-0-7190-5259-0
- Brian P. Levack, The Witch-Hunt in early modern Europe, Publisher: Routledge (Edition 4, 2015); ASIN B0B36Q6K49; ISBN 978-1-317-41241-0
- Bengt Ankerloo, Stuart Clark, William Monter, Witchcraft and Magic in Europe, Volume 4: The Period of the Witch Trials (December 2002), University of Pennsylvania Press; ISBN 978-0-8122-1787-2
