= 1612 imperial election =

- 13 June 1612

7 Prince-electors 4 votes needed to win
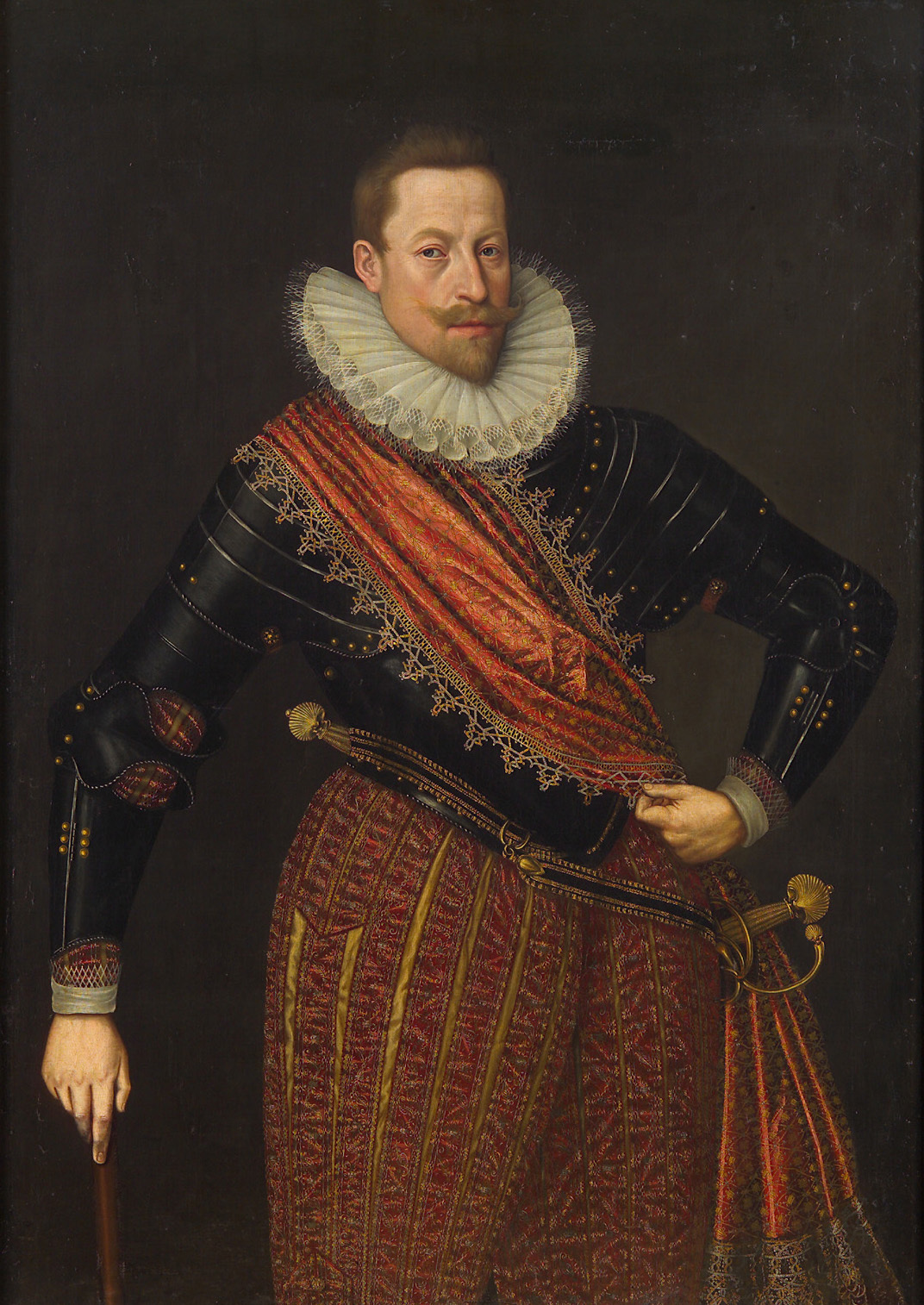
Candidate	Matthias
House	Habsburg
Electoral vote	7
Percentage	100%
Emperor before election
Rudolf II
House of Habsburg
Elected Emperor
Matthias
House of Habsburg

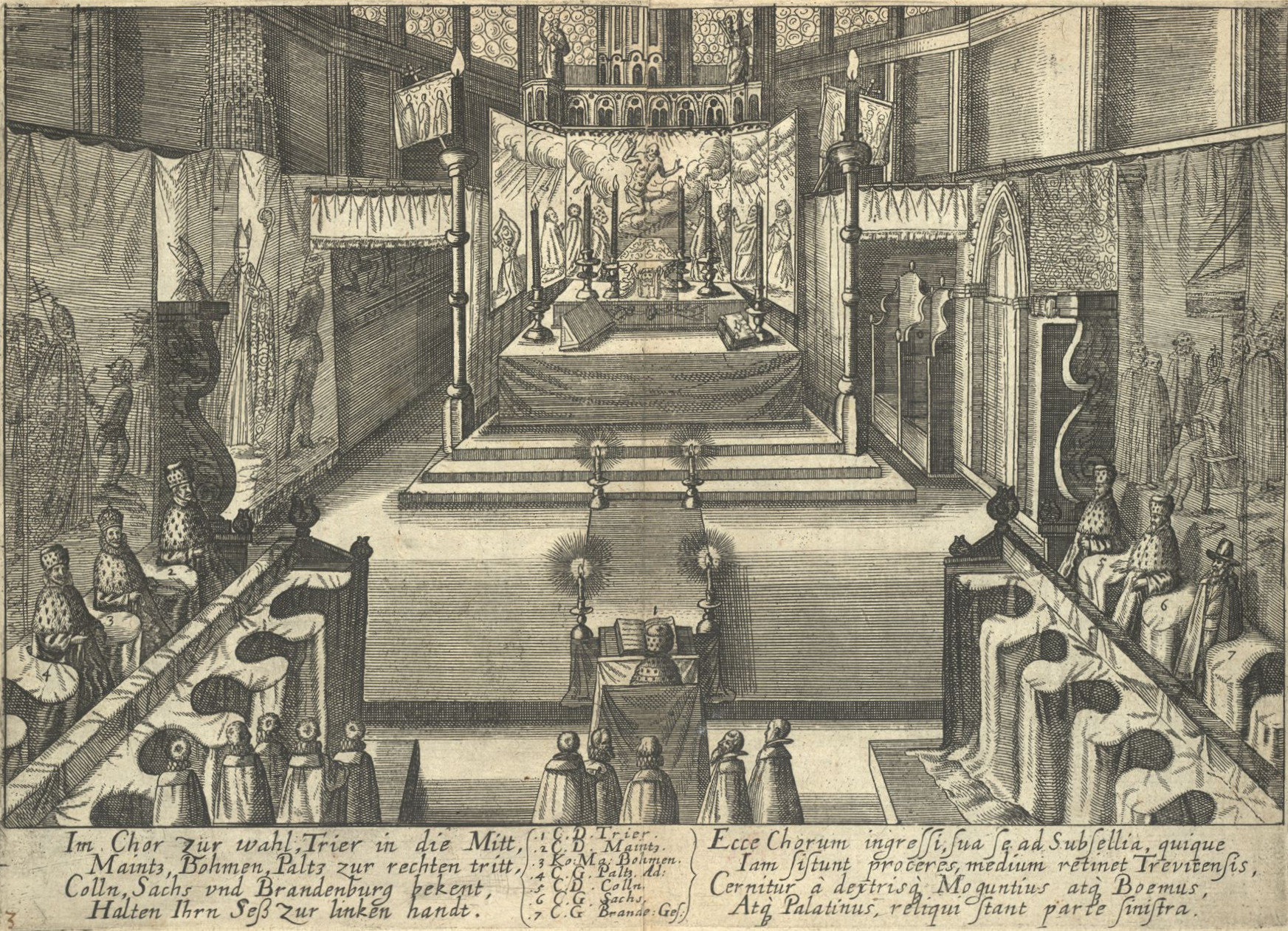
The election as depicted on a contemporary engraving

The imperial election of 1612 was an imperial election held to select the emperor of the Holy Roman Empire. It took place in Frankfurt on 13 June.

== Background ==
The previous Holy Roman Emperor, Rudolf II, Holy Roman Emperor, died on 20 January. The prince-electors convened to replace him were:

- Johann Schweikhard von Kronberg, elector of Mainz
- Lothar von Metternich, elector of Trier
- Ferdinand of Bavaria, elector of Cologne
- Matthias, king of Bohemia
- Frederick V, elector of the Electoral Palatinate
- John George I, elector of Saxony
- John Sigismund, elector of Brandenburg

== Election results ==
Ferdinand promoted the election of his brother-in-law Maximilian I, duke of Bavaria as emperor; however, Maximilian refused to accept the throne. Instead, Rudolf's next surviving brother, Matthias, who had already taken power in Bohemia and Hungary, was elected. He was crowned on 26 June in Frankfurt.

Elector	Electorate	Vote
Ferdinand of Bavaria	Cologne	Matthias
Philipp Christoph von Sötern	Trier	Matthias
Maximilian I	Bavaria	Matthias
John George I	Saxony	Matthias
Frederick IV	Palatinate	Matthias
Matthias	Bohemia	Matthias (voted for himself)
Lothar Franz von Schönborn	Mainz	Matthias
Total		7 votes, 100% (unanimous)
