= Berthe di Vito-Delvaux =

Belgian composer (1915–2005)

Berthe di Vito-Delvaux (17 May 1915 – 2 April 2005) was a Belgian composer.

== Biography ==
Berthe di Vito-Delvaux was born in Angleur, Belgium. She studied theory with Désiré Duysens, harmony with Louis Lavoye and piano with Jeanne House at the Royal Academy of Music of Liège, and composition under Léon Jongen at the Brussels Royal Academy of Music.

She married at eighteen, but completed her studies and then took a position teaching harmony at the Royal Academy of Music of Liège. In 1949, Berthe di Vito-Delvaux moved to Hasselt, and then in 1964 back to Angleur where she died in 2005.

== Awards and honors ==
Di Vito-Delvaux received honors and awards including:

- Maria Prize from the City of Liège 1938
- Prix de Rome in 1943
- Composition prize from the province of Limburg 1952
- Modeste Grétry Prize from Société d'Auteurs Belge – Belgische Auteurs Maatschappi (SABAM) in 1962
- Consecration Prize from the Province of Liège in 1978.

== Works ==
Di Vito-Delvaux composed ballets, opera, and theatrical works, as well as works for orchestra, chamber ensemble, voice and instruments. Selected works include:

- Sonata for horn and piano, Op. 109
- A Jacqueline op. 157, 1985 for violin and piano
- Abandon op. 169, 1988 for mezzo-soprano and piano
- Abigaïl op. 45, 1950 opera
- Abigaïl: Air de Hugo op. 45, 1950 for tenor and piano
- Adagio op. 68, 1954 for cello and piano
- Airs à danser op. 48, 1950 for orchestra
- Airs à danser op. 49, 1951 for piano
- Sonata for viola and piano, Op. 60, 1955
- Amours païennes op. 24, 1943 for tenor, soprano, women's choir and orchestra
- Ariane et Bacchus/Bacchantes op. 24, 1943 for orchestra
- Au long du chemin for women's choir a cappella
- Concerto, Op. 120 1969
- Grétry comic opera, Op. 137

Her compositions have been recorded and issued on CD including:

- Berthe di Vito-Delvaux (1915-2005) Chamber Music: Works for Voice and Wind Instruments, Audio CD, Quartziade
