= Schwirzheim =

- Municipality
- Location of Schwirzheim within Eifelkreis Bitburg-Prüm district
- Interactive map of Schwirzheim
- Location within Germany Location within Rhineland-Palatinate
- Coordinates: 50°14′04″N 6°31′43″E
- Country: Germany
- State: Rhineland-Palatinate
- District: Eifelkreis Bitburg-Prüm
- Municipal assoc.: Prüm

Government
  - Mayor (2019–24): Josef Sohns

Area
  - Total: 13.68 km^{2} (5.28 sq mi)
- Elevation: 490 m (1,610 ft)

Population (2025-12-31)
  - Total: 453
  - Density: 33.1/km^{2} (85.8/sq mi)
- Time zone: UTC+01:00 (CET)
  - Summer (DST): UTC+02:00 (CEST)
- Postal codes: 54597
- Dialling codes: 06558
- Vehicle registration: BIT
- Website: www.schwirzheim.de

Schwirzheim is a municipality in the district of Bitburg-Prüm, in Rhineland-Palatinate, western Germany.
