= Jakob von Eltz-Rübenach =

- Archbishop-Elector of Trier
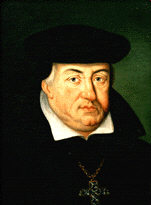
- Church: Catholic Church
- Diocese: Electorate of Trier
- In office: 1567–1581

Personal details
- Born: 1510
- Died: 4 June 1581 (aged 70–71)

Jakob von Eltz-Rübenach (1510–1581) was the Archbishop-Elector of Trier from 1567 to 1581.

== Biography ==
Jakob von Eltz-Rübenach was born in Burg Eltz in 1510, the second son of Johann von und zu Eltz and his wife Maria von Breitbach.

Jakob von Eltz-Rübenach began his career in the church in 1523 when he became a Domizellar of the Cathedral of Trier. He later studied law and theology at the University of Heidelberg, the University of Leuven, and the University of Freiburg. He gained a canonicate of the Cathedral of Trier on 15 September 1525. He was elected cantor of the cathedral on 30 June 1547 and as dean on 13 October 1547.

He was ordained as a priest on 6 April 1550. He was opposed to the Protestant cause, speaking out at the 1556 Reichstag in Regensberg and at the 1557 Colloquy of Worms. In 1564, he became rector of the Jesuit dominated University of Trier. In 1565, he required all students and faculty to subscribe to the Profession of the Tridentine Faith as required by the papal bull Iniunctum nobis.

Following the death of Archbishop of Trier Johann von der Leyen, the cathedral chapter of the Cathedral of Trier met in Wittlich on 7 April 1567 and elected Jakob von Eltz-Rübenach as the new Archbishop of Trier. Pope Pius V confirmed his appointment on 22 August 1567; he was consecrated as a bishop by Gregor Virneburg, Auxiliary Bishop of Trier on 17 April 1569.

A noted proponent of the Counter-Reformation, he played a role in reforming a number of monasteries in the archbishopric. He successfully had Prüm Abbey incorporated into the archbishopric in 1574.

He died in Trier on 4 June 1581 and is buried in the Cathedral of Trier. Hans Ruprecht Hoffmann completed an altar at his grave in 1597.

== See also ==
- Catholic Church in Germany

Jakob von und zu Eltz-Rübenach House of Eltz Born: 1510 on Eltz Castle Died: 4 June 1581 in Trier
Catholic Church titles
Regnal titles
Preceded by John VI	Archbishop-Elector of Trier as James III; 1567–1581	Succeeded by John VII
Preceded by Christopher of Manderscheid-Kayl	Prince-Abbot of Prüm; 1576–1581	Succeeded by John VII
