= Johann von Schönenberg =

- Archbishop of Trier
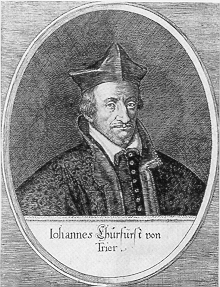
- Church: Catholic Church
- Diocese: Electorate of Trier
- In office: 1581–1599
- Predecessor: James III
- Successor: Lothar von Metternich

Orders
- Consecration: 12 August 1582 by Ludovico Madruzzo

Personal details
- Born: 1525
- Died: 1 May 1599 (aged 73–74)

Johann von Schönenberg (1525–1599) was the Archbishop-Elector of Trier from 1581 to 1599.

Von Schönenberg was born in Burg Hartelstein in Schwirzheim in 1525. His father was also named Johann von Schönenberg. He became Domizellar of the Cathedral of Trier in 1538. He spent 1546-48 studying at the University of Heidelberg and the University of Freiburg.

On 31 July 1581 the cathedral chapter of the Cathedral of Trier elected Johann von Schönenberg to be the new Archbishop of Trier. Pope Gregory XIII confirmed his appointment on 26 January 1582. He was consecrated as a bishop by Ludovico Madruzzo on 12 August 1582. As archbishop, Johann von Schönenberg presided over the Trier witch trials.

Shortly before his death, Lothar von Metternich became his coadjutor archbishop. He died in Koblenz on 1 May 1599. He is buried in the Cathedral of Trier. In 1602, Hans Ruprecht Hoffmann completed a grave-altar at von Schönenberg's tomb.

John of Schönenberg Born: 1525 on Hartelstein Castle near Schwirzheim Died: 1 May 1599 in Coblenz
Catholic Church titles
Regnal titles
Preceded by James III	Archbishop-Elector of Trier and Prince-Abbot of Prüm as John VII; 1581–1599	Succeeded by Lothar von Metternich
