= Lothar von Metternich =

Roman Catholic archbishop (1551–1623)

- Archbishop of Trier
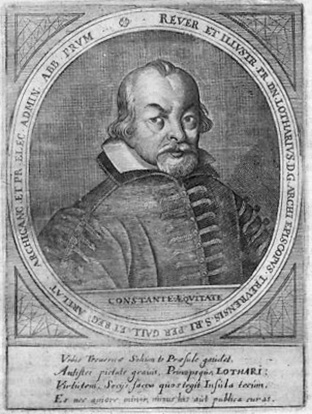
- Church: Catholic Church
- Diocese: Electorate of Trier
- In office: 1599–1623

Personal details
- Born: 23 August 1551
- Died: 17 September 1623 (aged 72)

Lothar Johann Reinhard von Metternich (23 August 1551 – 17 September 1623) was the Archbishop-Elector of Trier from 1599 to 1623.

== Biography ==
Lothar von Metternich was born in Schloss Vettelhoven in Grafschaft on 31 August 1551, the son of Johann von Metternich (1500-1562), Lord of Vettelhoven and bailiff of Saffenberg, and his fourth wife, Katharina von der Leyen zu Adendorf (1528-1567). He attended the University of Cologne from 1567 to 1577; the University of Perugia from 1577 to 1579; and the University of Padua from 1579 to 1581. In addition to his native German, he was fluent in Flemish, French, Italian, and Latin.

He became a Domizellar at the Cathedral of Trier in 1570; a canon of the cathedral in 1575; and Domscholaster in 1590. He was ordained as a priest on 13 June 1599.

Following the death of Archbishop of Trier Johann von Schönenberg, the cathedral chapter of the Cathedral of Trier elected Metternich as coadjutor archbishop on 7 August 1599. Pope Clement VIII confirmed his appointment on 11 October 1599. Bishop emeritus of Osor Coriolani Garzadori consecrated Metternich as a bishop on 30 July 1600 in the church dedicated to Florinus of Remüs in Koblenz.

Metternich's chief goal as archbishop was to improve the finances of the Archbishopric of Trier. He introduced a number of new taxes. In 1609, he joined the Catholic League, which resulted in further expenses for the Archbishopric. He participated in the imperial election of Matthias, Holy Roman Emperor in 1612 and of Ferdinand II, Holy Roman Emperor in 1619.

After a long illness, Metternich died on 17 September 1623 in Koblenz. He is buried in the Cathedral of Trier.

Lothar von Metternich House of Metternich Born: 31 August 1551 on Vettelhoven Castle in Grafschaft Died: 17 September 1623 in Coblenz
Catholic Church titles
Regnal titles
| Preceded by John VII | Archbishop-Elector of Trier and Prince-Abbot of Prüm; 1599–1623 | Succeeded by Philipp Christoph von Sötern |
