= Klemens von Metternich =

Austrian statesman (1773–1859)

His Most Serene Highness Klemens von Metternich Prince of Metternich-Winneburg zu Beilstein
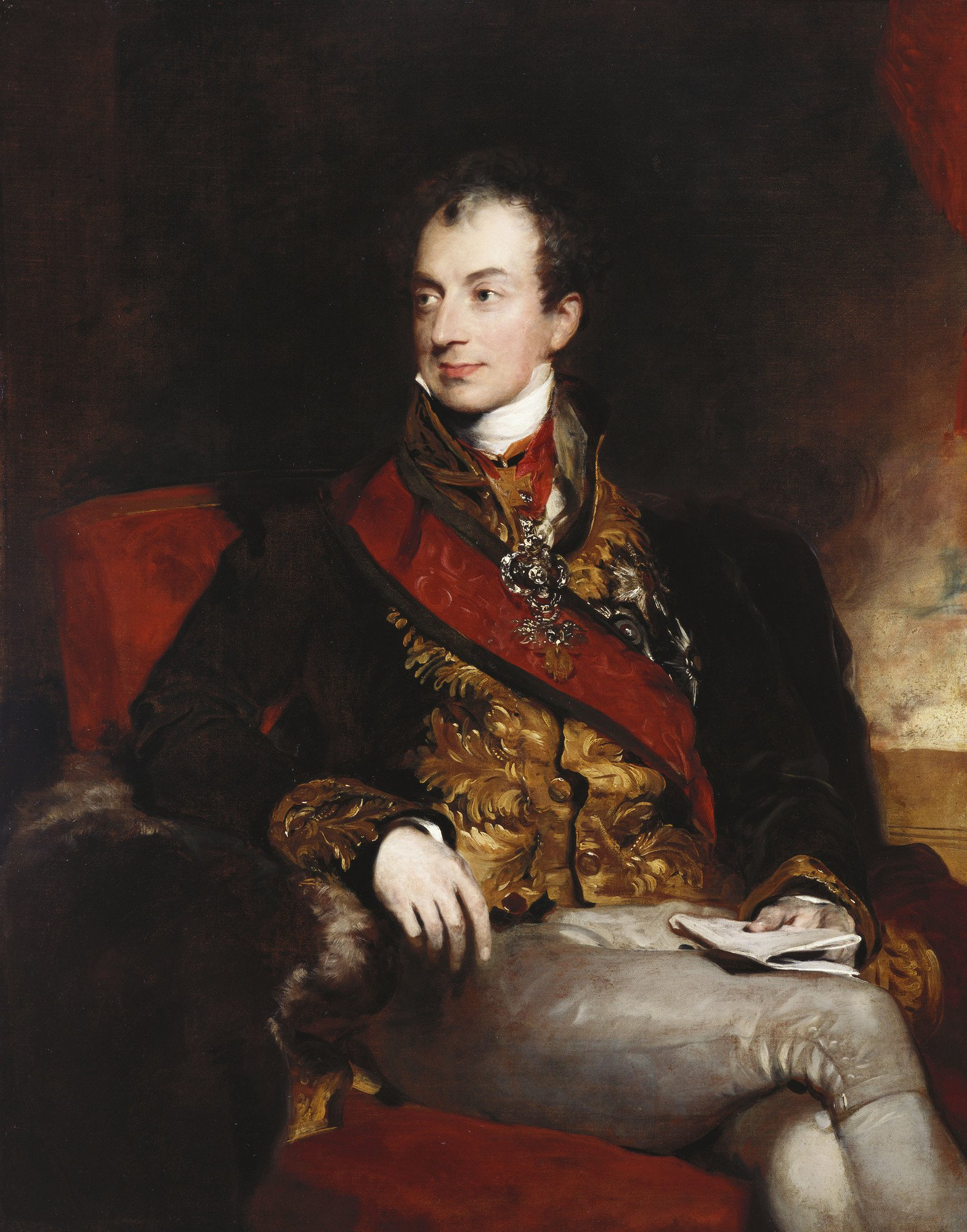
- Portrait of Prince Metternich by Thomas Lawrence, 1815

Chancellor of the Austrian Empire
- In office 25 May 1821 – 13 March 1848
- Monarchs: Francis I; Ferdinand I
- Preceded by: Office established
- Succeeded by: Franz Anton (as Minister-President)

Foreign Minister of the Austrian Empire
- In office 8 October 1809 – 13 March 1848
- Monarchs: Francis I; Ferdinand I
- Preceded by: Count Warthausen
- Succeeded by: Count Charles-Louis de Ficquelmont

Austrian Ambassador to France
- In office 1806–1809
- Monarch: Francis I
- Preceded by: Peter von Floret (as Chargé d'affaires)
- Succeeded by: Prince of Schwarzenberg

Personal details
- Born: 15 May 1773 Koblenz, Electorate of Trier, Holy Roman Empire
- Died: 11 June 1859 (aged 86) Vienna, Austrian Empire
- Resting place: St. Wenceslaus, Plasy; 49°56′5″N 13°23′26″E
- Spouses: Princess Eleonore von Kaunitz (m. 1795; died 1825); Baroness Antoinette von Leykam (m. 1827; died 1829); Countess Melanie Zichy-Ferraris (m. 1831; died 1854)
- Relations: House of Metternich
- Children: See descendants list
- Parents: Franz Georg Karl, Count of Metternich-Winneburg; Countess Beatrix von Kageneck
- Education: University of Strasbourg; University of Mainz
- Occupation: Politician; diplomat
- Known for: Congress of Vienna; Concert of Europe
- Awards: See: § Awards and honours
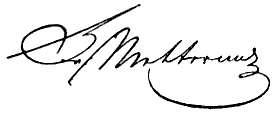
- Signature

Klemens Wenzel Nepomuk Lothar, Prince of Metternich-Winneburg zu Beilstein (Note: German: Klemens Wenzel Nepomuk Lothar Fürst von Metternich-Winneburg zu Beilstein) (15 May 1773 – 11 June 1859), known as Klemens von Metternich (/ˈmɛtərnɪx/ MET-ər-nikh, German: [ˈkleːmɛns fɔn ˈmɛtɐnɪç]) or Prince Metternich, was a German statesman and diplomat in the service of the Austrian Empire. Metternich was at the center of the European balance of power known as the Concert of Europe for three decades as Austrian foreign minister from 1809 and chancellor from 1821 until the Revolutions of 1848 forced his resignation.

Born into the House of Metternich in 1773 as the son of a diplomat, Metternich received a good education at the universities of Strasbourg and Mainz. Metternich rose through key diplomatic posts, including ambassadorial roles in the Kingdom of Saxony, the Kingdom of Prussia, and especially Napoleonic France. One of his first assignments as Foreign Minister was to engineer a détente with France that included the marriage of Napoleon to the Austrian archduchess Marie Louise. Soon after, he engineered Austria's entry into the War of the Sixth Coalition on the Allied side, signed the Treaty of Fontainebleau that sent Napoleon into exile and led the Austrian delegation at the Congress of Vienna that divided post-Napoleonic Europe amongst the major powers. For his service to the Austrian Empire, he was given the title of Prince in October 1813.

Under his guidance, the "Metternich system" of international congresses continued for another decade as Austria aligned itself with Russia and to a lesser extent Prussia. This marked the high point of Austria's diplomatic importance and thereafter Metternich slowly slipped into the periphery of international diplomacy. At home, Metternich held the post of Chancellor of State from 1821 until 1848 under both Francis I and his son Ferdinand I. After a brief exile in London, Brighton, and Brussels that lasted until 1851, he returned to the Viennese court, only this time to offer advice to Ferdinand's successor, Franz Josef. Having outlived his generation of politicians, Metternich died at the age of 86 in 1859.

A traditional conservative, Metternich was keen to maintain the balance of power, particularly by resisting Russian territorial ambitions in Central Europe and the Ottoman Empire. He disliked liberalism and strove to prevent the breakup of the Austrian Empire, for example, by crushing nationalist revolts in Austrian northern Italy. At home, he pursued a similar policy, using censorship and a wide-ranging spy network to suppress unrest.

Metternich has been both praised and heavily criticized for the policies he pursued. His supporters pointed out that he presided over the "Austrian system" when international diplomacy helped prevent major wars in Europe. His qualities as a diplomat were commended, some noting that his achievements were considerable in light of the weakness of his negotiating position. Meanwhile, his detractors argued that he could have done much to secure Austria's future, and he was deemed a stumbling block to reforms in Austria. Metternich was also a supporter of the arts, taking a particular interest in music; he knew some of the most eminent composers in Europe, including Haydn, Beethoven, Rossini, Paganini and Liszt.

== Early life ==
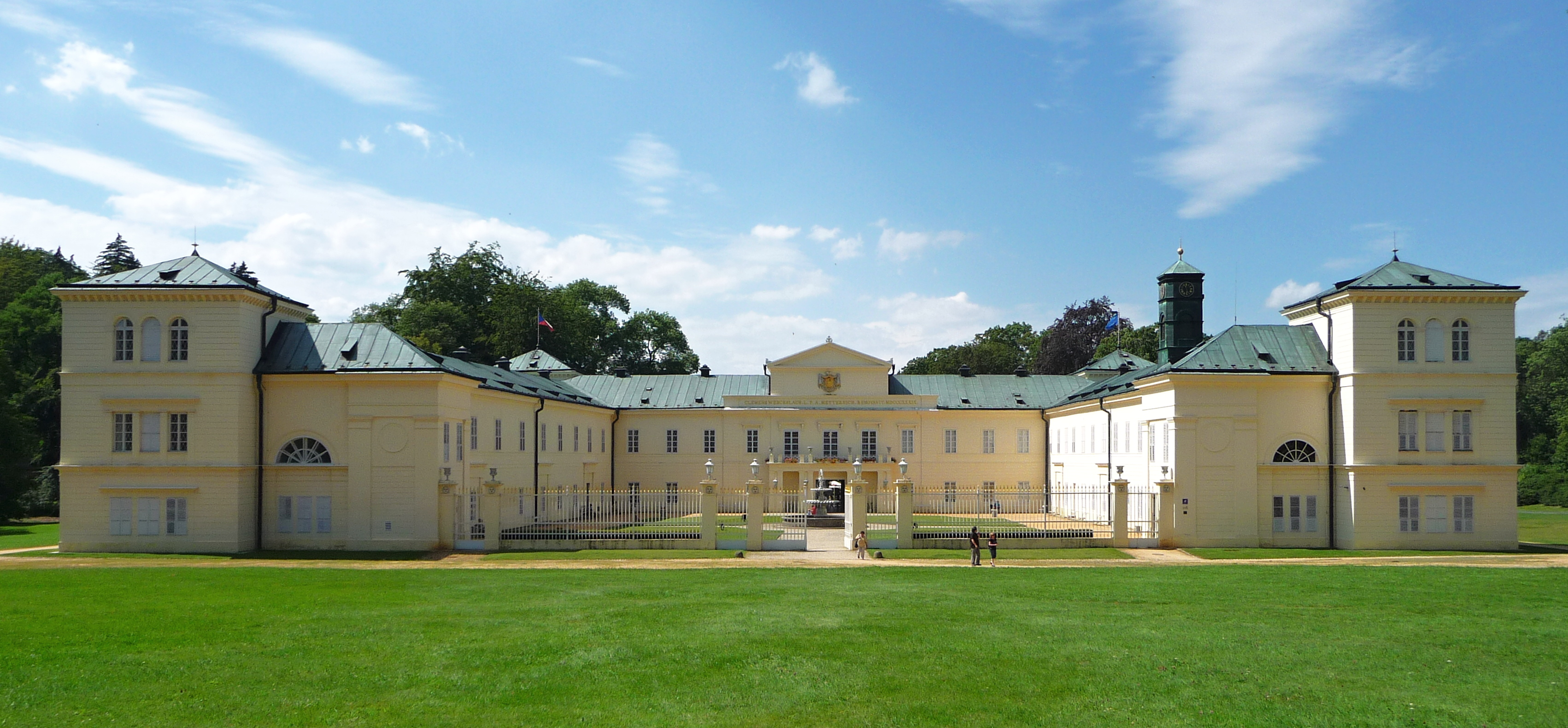
Schloss Königswart in Bohemia

Klemens Metternich was born into the old Rhenish House of Metternich on 15 May 1773 to Franz Georg Karl Count of Metternich-Winneburg zu Beilstein (1746–1818), a diplomat who had passed from the service of the Electorate of Trier to that of the Imperial court, and his wife Countess Maria Beatrix Aloisia von Kageneck (1755–1828). He was named in honour of Prince Clemens Wenceslaus of Saxony, the archbishop-elector of Trier and the past employer of his father. He was the eldest son and had one older sister Pauline (1772–1855), wife of Duke Ferdinand Frederick Augustus of Württemberg. At the time of his birth, the family possessed a ruined keep at Beilstein, a castle at Winneberg, an estate west of Koblenz, and another in Königswart, Bohemia, won during the 17th century. At this time Metternich's father, described as "a boring babbler and chronic liar" by a contemporary, was the Austrian ambassador to the courts of the three Rhenish electors (Trier, Cologne and Mainz). Metternich's education was handled by his mother, heavily influenced by their proximity to France; Metternich spoke French better than German. As a child he went on official visits with his father and, under the direction of Protestant tutor John Frederick Simon, was tutored in academic subjects, swimming, and horsemanship.

In mid-1788, Metternich began studying law at the University of Strasbourg, matriculating on 12 November. While a student he was for some time accommodated by Prince Maximilian of Zweibrücken, the future King of Bavaria. At this time he was described by Simon as "happy, handsome and lovable", though contemporaries would later recount how he had been a liar and a braggart. Metternich left Strasbourg in September 1790 to attend Leopold II's October coronation in Frankfurt, where he performed the largely honorific role of Ceremonial Marshal to the Catholic Bench of the College of the Counts of Westphalia. There, under the wing of his father, he met with the future Francis II.

Between the end of 1790 and mid-1792 Metternich studied law at the University of Mainz, receiving a more conservative education than at Strasbourg, a city unsafe to return to due to the unfolding French Revolution, which had begun in 1789. In the summers he worked with his father, who had been appointed plenipotentiary and effective ruler of the Austrian Netherlands. In March 1792 Francis succeeded as Holy Roman Emperor and was crowned in July, affording Metternich a reprise of his earlier role of Ceremonial Marshal.

In the meantime France had declared war on Austria, beginning the War of the First Coalition (1792–97) and making Metternich's further study in Mainz impossible. Now in the employment of his father, he was sent on a special mission to the front. Here he led the interrogation of the French Minister of War the Marquis de Beurnonville and several accompanying National Convention commissioners. Metternich observed the siege and fall of Valenciennes, later looking back on these as substantial lessons about warfare. In early 1794 he was sent to England, ostensibly on official business helping Viscount Desandrouin, the Treasurer-General of the Austrian Netherlands, to negotiate a loan.

== Marriage and the Congress of Rastatt ==
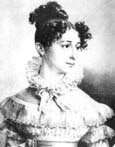
Countess Eleonore of Kaunitz-Rietberg (1775–1825), Metternich's first wife

In England, he met King George III on several occasions and dined with a number of influential British politicians, including William Pitt, Charles James Fox and Edmund Burke. He also dined with the renowned composer Joseph Haydn and his impresario Johann Peter Salomon after seeing several of their concerts at Hanover Square. It was at one of these concerts where he recognized his one-time teacher, Andreas Hofmann in the audience who went to spy on England for the French. Metternich was nominated the new Minister Plenipotentiary to the Austrian Netherlands and left England in September 1794. On arrival, he found an exiled and powerless government in a headlong retreat from the latest French advance. In October a revitalised French army swept into Germany and annexed all of the Metternich estates except Königswart. Disappointed, and affected by strong criticism of his father's policies, he joined his parents in Vienna in November. On 27 September 1795 he married Countess Eleonore von Kaunitz-Rietberg (1775–1825), daughter of Ernst Christoph, Fürst von Kaunitz-Rietberg (1737–1797) and Princess Maria Leopoldine zu Oettingen-Spielberg (1741–1795), a granddaughter of former Austrian chancellor Wenzel Anton, Prince of Kaunitz-Rietberg. The marriage was arranged by Metternich's mother and introduced him to Viennese society. This was undoubtedly part of the motivation for Metternich, who demonstrated less affection for her than she for him. Two conditions were imposed by the father of the bride, Prince Kaunitz: first, the still youthful Eleonore was to continue to live at home; and second, Metternich was forbidden from serving as a diplomat as long as the Prince was still alive. Their daughter Maria was born in January 1797.

After Metternich's studies in Vienna, the Prince's death in September 1797 allowed Metternich to participate in the Congress of Rastatt. Initially his father, who headed the imperial delegation, took him as a secretary while ensuring that, when proceedings officially started in December 1797, he was named the representative of the Catholic Bench of the College of the Counts of Westphalia. A bored Metternich remained at Rastatt in this role until 1799 when the congress was finally wound down. During this period Eleonore had chosen to live with Metternich at Rastatt and gave birth to sons Francis (February 1798) and, shortly after the end of the Congress, Klemens (June 1799). Much to Metternich's anguish, Klemens died after only a few days, and Francis soon contracted a lung infection from which he would never recover.

== Ambassador ==
=== Dresden and Berlin ===
The Holy Roman Empire's defeat in the War of the Second Coalition shook up diplomatic circles, and the promising Metternich was now offered a choice between three ministerial positions: to the Imperial Diet at Regensburg; to the Kingdom of Denmark at Copenhagen; or to the Electorate of Saxony at Dresden. He chose Dresden in late January 1801, and his appointment was officially announced in February. Metternich summered in Vienna, where he wrote his "Instructions", a memorandum showing a much greater understanding of statesmanship than his earlier writing. He visited the Königswart estate in the autumn before taking up his new position on 4 November. The subtleties of the memorandum were lost on the Saxon court, which was headed by the retiring Frederick Augustus I, a man with little political initiative. Despite the boredom of the court, Metternich enjoyed the light-hearted frivolity of the city and took up a mistress, Princess Katharina Bagration-Mukhranska, who bore him a daughter, Marie-Clementine. In January 1803 Metternich and his wife had a child whom they named Viktor. In Dresden Metternich also made a number of important contacts including Friedrich Gentz, a publicist who would serve Metternich as both confidant and critic for the next thirty years. He also established links with important Polish and French political figures.

Count Metternich is young but by no means maladroit. We shall see how he shapes up in Berlin.

— Colloredo to Thugut (Palmer 1972, p. 39)

To compensate for the loss of the Metternich's ancestral estates in the Moselle valley when the French Republic annexed the west bank of the Rhine, the Imperial Recess of 1803 brought Metternich's family new estates in Ochsenhausen with Sovereign powers, the title of Prince of the Holy Roman Empire, and a seat in the Imperial Diet. In the ensuing diplomatic reshuffle Metternich was appointed ambassador to the Kingdom of Prussia, being notified of this in February 1803 and taking his position in November of that year.

He arrived in Prussia at a critical juncture in European diplomacy, soon growing worried about the territorial ambitions of Napoleon Bonaparte, newly the leader of France. This fear was shared by the Russian court under Alexander I, and the Tsar kept Metternich informed of Russian policy. By autumn of 1804 Vienna decided on action entered into in August 1805 when the Austrian Empire (as the Habsburg monarchy was in the process of becoming) began its involvement in the War of the Third Coalition. Metternich's now almost impossible task was to convince Prussia to join the coalition against Bonaparte. Their eventual agreement was not due to Metternich, however, and after the coalition's defeat at the Battle of Austerlitz, Prussia disregarded the agreement and signed a treaty with the French instead.

=== Paris ===
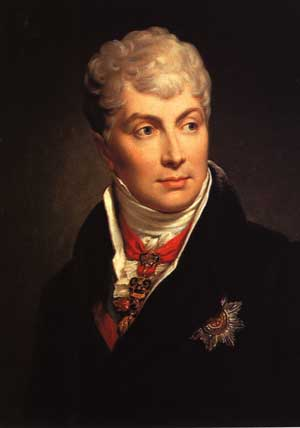
Metternich, c. 1808

In the ensuing reshuffle in Vienna Johann Philipp Stadion, Count von Warthausen became the Foreign Minister of Austrian Empire, freeing Metternich to assume the post of Ambassador to the Russian Empire. He never made it to Russia, as need had arisen for a new Austrian at the French court. Metternich was approved for the post in June 1806. (Note: There is some confusion over why Metternich was selected. Napoleon said he wanted "a Kaunitz", and whether he literally meant someone from the house of Kaunitz or merely someone in the style of the Prince of Kaunitz, who had been ambassador to France from 1750 until 1753, this worked in favour of Metternich, the husband of a Kaunitz (Palmer 1972, pp. 44–47).) He enjoyed being in demand and was happy to be sent to France on a generous salary of 90,000 florins a year. After an arduous trip he took up residence in August 1806, being briefed by Baron von Vincent and Engelbert von Floret, whom he would retain as a close adviser for two decades. He met French foreign minister Prince Charles Maurice de Talleyrand-Périgord on 5 August and Napoleon himself five days later at the Château de Saint-Cloud. Metternich's wife and children joined him in October, and he went into Paris society, using his charm to win great eminence there. The presence of Eleonore did not prevent him from a series of affairs, with known or at least generally-suspected partners including Princess Caroline Murat and Laure Junot.

The War of the Fourth Coalition drew both Talleyrand and Napoleon eastwards. After the Treaties of Tilsit of July 1807 Metternich saw that Austria's position in Europe was much more vulnerable but believed the accord between Russia and France would not last. In the meantime he found the new French Foreign Minister, Jean-Baptiste Champagny unaccommodating and struggled to negotiate a satisfactory settlement over the future of several French forts on the River Inn. Over the following months the reach of Austrian policy, and Metternich's own reputation, increased.

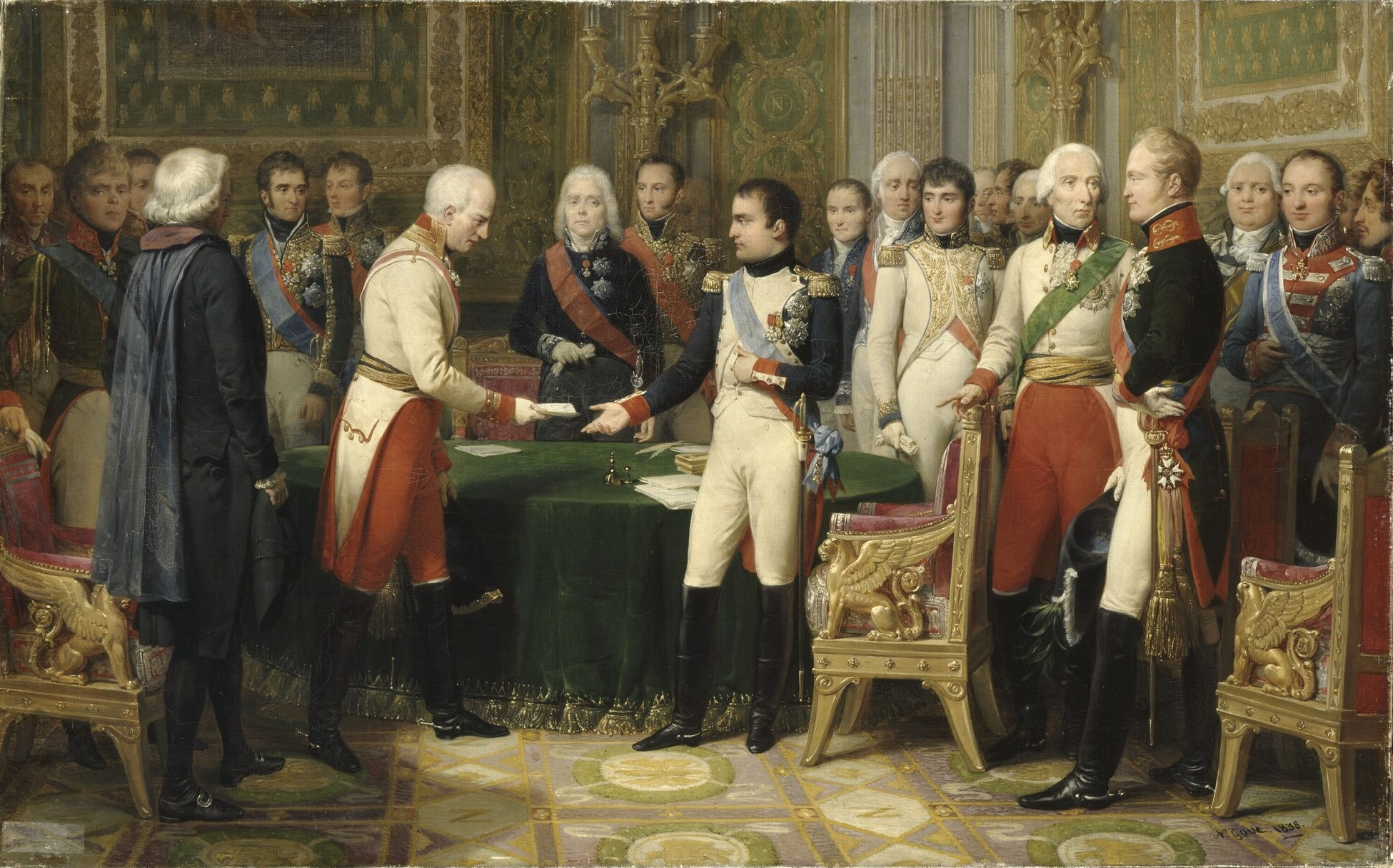
The Congress of Erfurt by Nicolas Gosse, 1838. Napoleon receiving von Vincent at Erfurt, a congress Metternich was not allowed to attend

In a memorable event, Metternich argued with Napoleon at Napoleon's 39th birthday celebrations in August 1808 over the increasingly obvious preparations for war on both sides. Soon after, Napoleon refused Metternich's attendance at the Congress of Erfurt. Metternich was later glad to hear from Talleyrand that Napoleon's attempts at the Congress to get Russia to invade Austria had proved unsuccessful.

In a report to Stadion, Metternich the ambassador concluded that the House of Hohenzollern had been relegated and that Austria's situation had worsened. The Confederation of the Rhine was hostile to Austria and a military conflict with France would have to be fought on two fronts between the Weichsel river and the Inn river. Metternich continued to oppose a war with France and pointed out that the government in Vienna only needed to wait, as Napoleon had no plans for his own succession.

== Foreign minister ==
=== Détente with France ===
Now back in Austria, Metternich witnessed first hand the Austrian army's defeat at the Battle of Wagram in 1809. Stadion tendered his resignation as Foreign Minister in the aftermath, and the emperor immediately offered the post to Metternich. Metternich, worried that Napoleon would seize on this to demand harsher peace terms, instead agreed to become a minister of state (which he did on 8 July) and to lead negotiations with the French on the understanding that he would replace Stadion as Foreign Minister at a later date. During peace talks at Altenburg, Metternich put forward pro-French proposals to save the Austrian monarchy. Napoleon, however, disliked his position on the future of Poland, and Metternich was gradually displaced from the proceedings by Prince Liechtenstein. He soon regained influence, however, on 8 October, as Foreign Minister (and additionally that of Minister of the Imperial Household). In early 1810 Metternich's earlier affair with Junot became public but, because of Eleonore's understanding, the scandal was minimal.

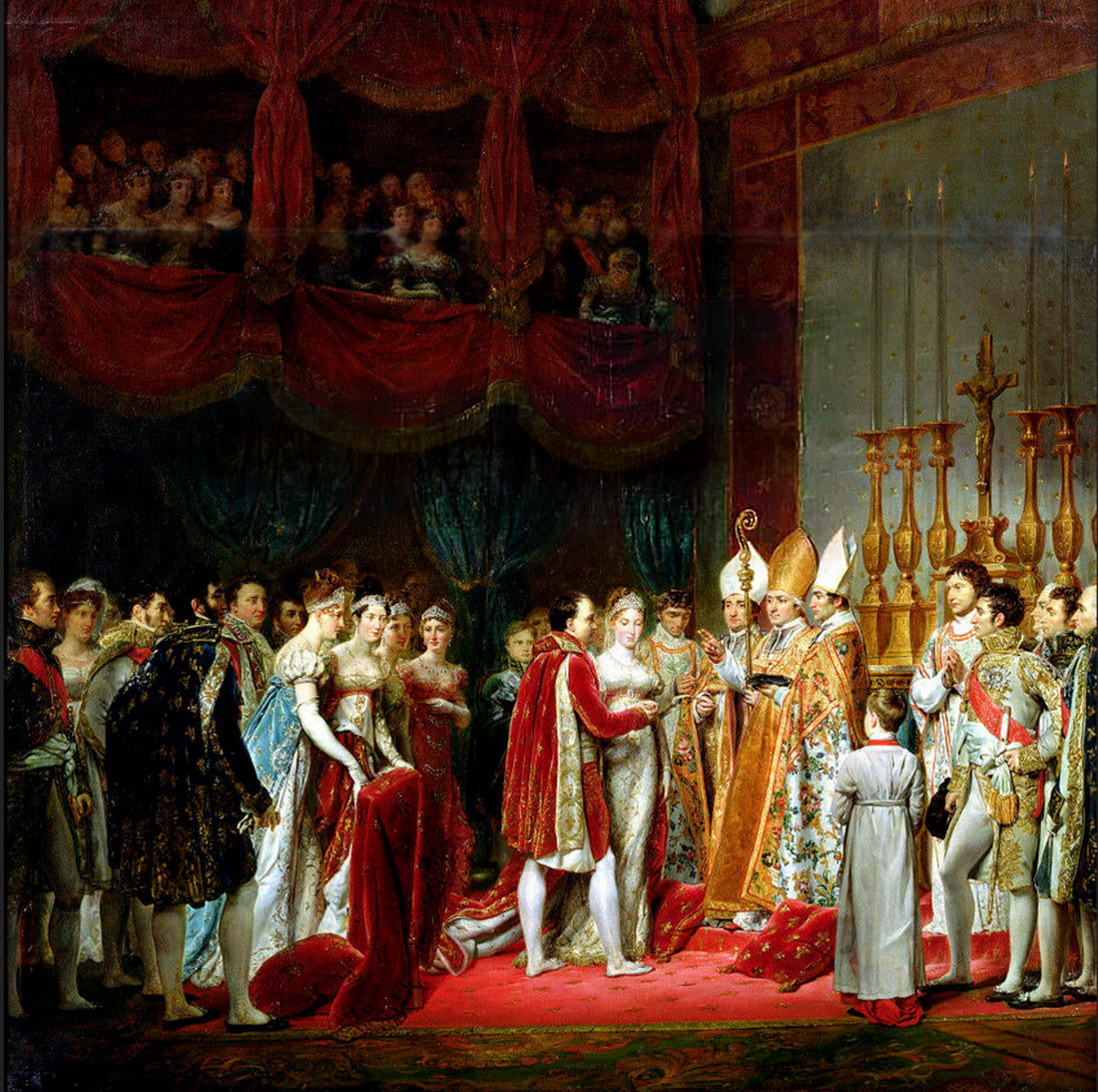
Metternich was influential in bringing about the marriage of Napoleon to Archduchess Marie Louise of Austria. The Wedding of Napoleon and Marie Louise by Georges Rouget.

One of Metternich's first tasks was to push for the marriage of Napoleon to Archduchess Marie Louise rather than to the Tsar's youngest sister Anna Pavlovna. Metternich would later seek to distance himself from the marriage by claiming it was Napoleon's own idea, but this is improbable; in any case, he was happy to claim responsibility at the time. By 7 February Napoleon had agreed and the pair were married by proxy on 11 March. Marie Louise left for France soon after and Metternich followed by a different route and unofficially. The trip was designed, Metternich explained, to transport his family (stranded in France by the outbreak of war) home and to report to the Austrian Emperor about Marie Louise's activities.

Instead, Metternich stayed six months, entrusting his office in Vienna to his father. He set about using the marriage, and flattery, to renegotiate the terms set out in the Treaty of Schönbrunn. The concessions he won were trivial, however: a few trading rights, delay in the payment of the war indemnity, restitution of some estates belonging to Germans in the Austrian service, including the Metternich family's, and the lifting of a 150,000-man limit on the Austrian army. The last was particularly welcomed as a sign of increased Austrian independence, although Austria could no longer afford an army greater than the limit prescribed.

==== As France's ally ====
When Metternich returned to Vienna in October 1810, he was no longer as popular. His influence was limited to foreign affairs, and his attempts to get a full Council of State reintroduced had failed. Convinced that a much weakened Austria should avoid another invasion by France, he rejected the advances of Tsar Alexander and instead concluded an alliance with Napoleon on 14 March 1812. He also supported a period of moderate censorship, aimed at preventing provocation of the French. Requiring that only 30,000 Austrian troops fight alongside the French, the alliance treaty was more generous than the one Prussia had signed a month earlier; this allowed Metternich to give both Britain and Russia assurances that Austria remained committed to curbing Napoleonic ambitions. He accompanied his sovereign for a final meeting with Napoleon at Dresden in May 1812 before Napoleon embarked upon the French invasion of Russia.

The Dresden meeting revealed that Austria's influence in Europe had reached its lowest point, and Metternich was now bent on re-establishing that influence by using what he considered strong ties with all sides in the war, proposing general peace talks headed by Austria. Over the next three months, he would slowly distance Austria from the French cause, while avoiding alliance with either Prussia or Russia, and remaining open to any proposal that would secure a place for the combined Bonaparte-Habsburg dynasty. This was driven by concern that if Napoleon were defeated, Russia and Prussia would stand to gain too much. Napoleon was intransigent, however, and the fighting (now officially the War of the Sixth Coalition) continued. Austria's alliance with France ended in February 1813, and Austria then moved to a position of armed neutrality.

==== As a neutral ====
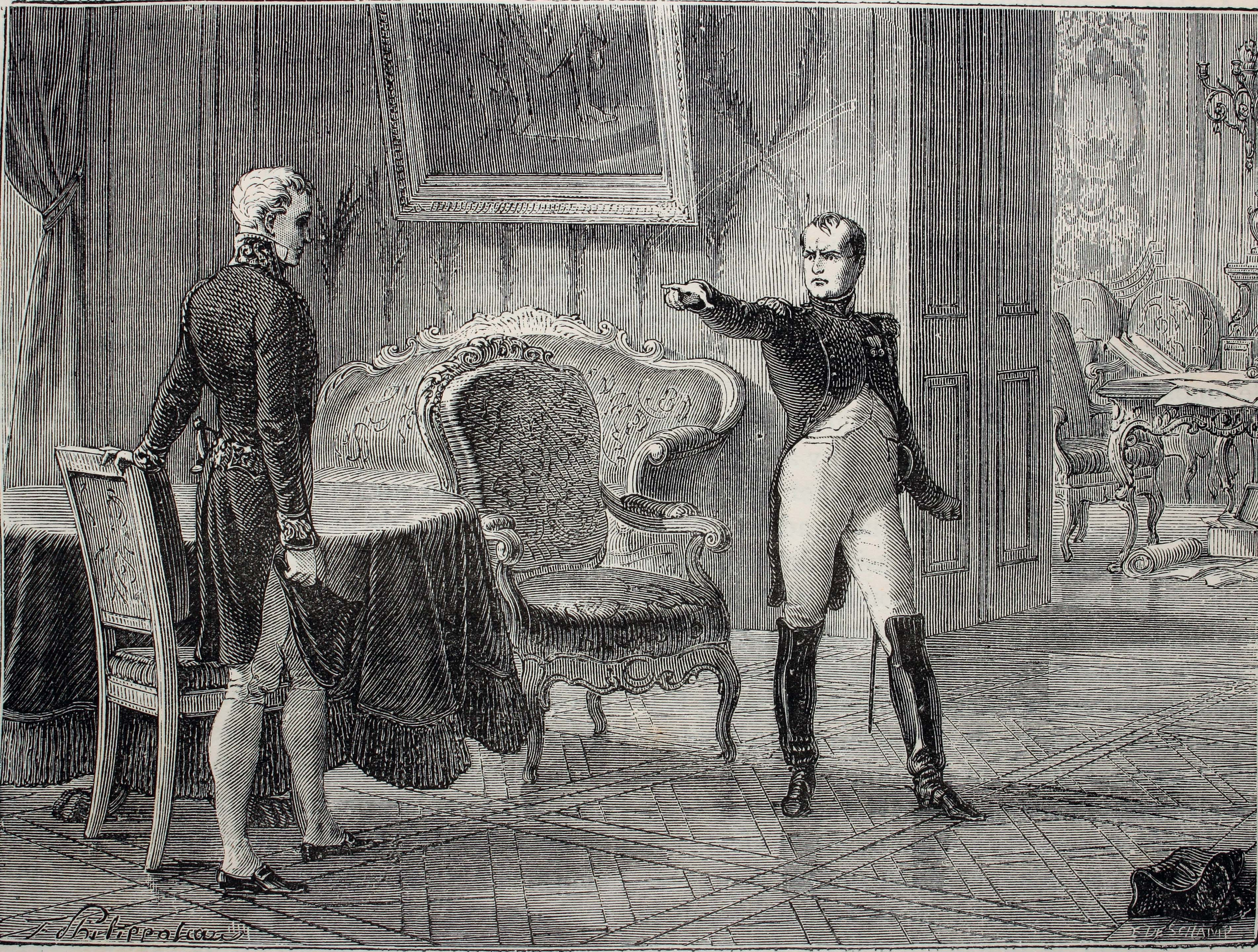
The meeting between French emperor Napoleon I and Austrian diplomat Marquess Klemens von Metternich in the Marcolini Palace in Dresden on 26 June 1813

Metternich was much less keen on turning against France than many of his contemporaries (though not the Emperor), and he favoured his own plans for a general settlement. In November 1813 he offered Napoleon the Frankfurt proposals, which would allow Napoleon to remain Emperor but would reduce France to its "natural frontiers" and undo its control of most of Italy, Germany, and the Netherlands. Napoleon, victorious at the Battles of Lützen and Bautzen, delayed too long and lost this opportunity; by December he had been defeated at the Battle of Leipzig and the Allies had withdrawn the offer. By early 1814, as they were closing in on Paris, Napoleon agreed to the Frankfurt proposals, too late, and he rejected the new, harsher terms then proposed.

Nevertheless, the Allies were not faring well, and although a statement of general war aims that included many nods to Austria was secured from Russia, Britain remained distrustful and generally unwilling to give up the military initiative she had fought 20 years to establish. Despite this, Francis created the Austrian Foreign Minister Grand-Chancellor of the Order of Maria Theresa, a post which had been vacant since the time of Kaunitz. Metternich increasingly worried that Napoleon's retreat would bring with it disorder that would harm the Habsburgs. A peace had to be concluded soon, he believed. Since Britain could not be coerced, he sent proposals to France and Russia only. These were rejected, though, after the battles of Battle of Lützen (2 May) and Battle of Bautzen (20–21 May), a French-initiated truce was called. Starting in April Metternich began to "slowly and reluctantly" prepare Austria for war with France; the armistice provided Austria time for fuller complete mobilisation.

In June, Metternich left Vienna to personally handle negotiations at Gitschin in Bohemia. When he arrived he benefitted from the hospitality of Princess Wilhelmine, Duchess of Sagan and began an affair with her that lasted several months. No other mistress ever achieved such influence over Metternich as Wilhelmine, and he would continue to write to her after their separation. Meanwhile, French Foreign Minister Hugues-Bernard Maret remained elusive, though Metternich did manage to discuss the state of affairs with the Tsar on 18–19 June at Opotschna. In talks which would later be ratified as the Reichenbach Convention they agreed on general peace demands (Note: , namely that Lübeck and Hamburg would return to being free cities, and more generally the end of direct French control over the Confederation of the Rhine; the return of annexed Prussian territory; the return of the Illyrian Provinces to Austria; and the dissolution of the French-dominated Grand Duchy of Warsaw (Palmer 1972, p. 97).) and set out a process by which Austria could enter the war on the Coalition side. Shortly afterwards Metternich was invited to join Napoleon at Dresden, where he could put the terms directly. Though no reliable record of their meeting on 26 June 1813 exists, it seems it was a stormy but effective meeting. The agreement was finally reached as Metternich was about to leave: peace talks would start in Prague in July and run until 20 August. In agreeing to this Metternich had ignored the Reichenbach Convention, and this angered Austria's Coalition allies. The Conference of Prague would never properly meet since Napoleon gave his representatives Armand Caulaincourt and the Count of Narbonne insufficient powers to negotiate. At the informal discussions held in lieu of the conference, Caulaincourt implied that Napoleon would not negotiate until an allied army threatened France itself. This convinced Metternich, and, after an ultimatum Metternich issued to France went unheeded, Austria declared war on 12 August.

==== As a coalition partner ====
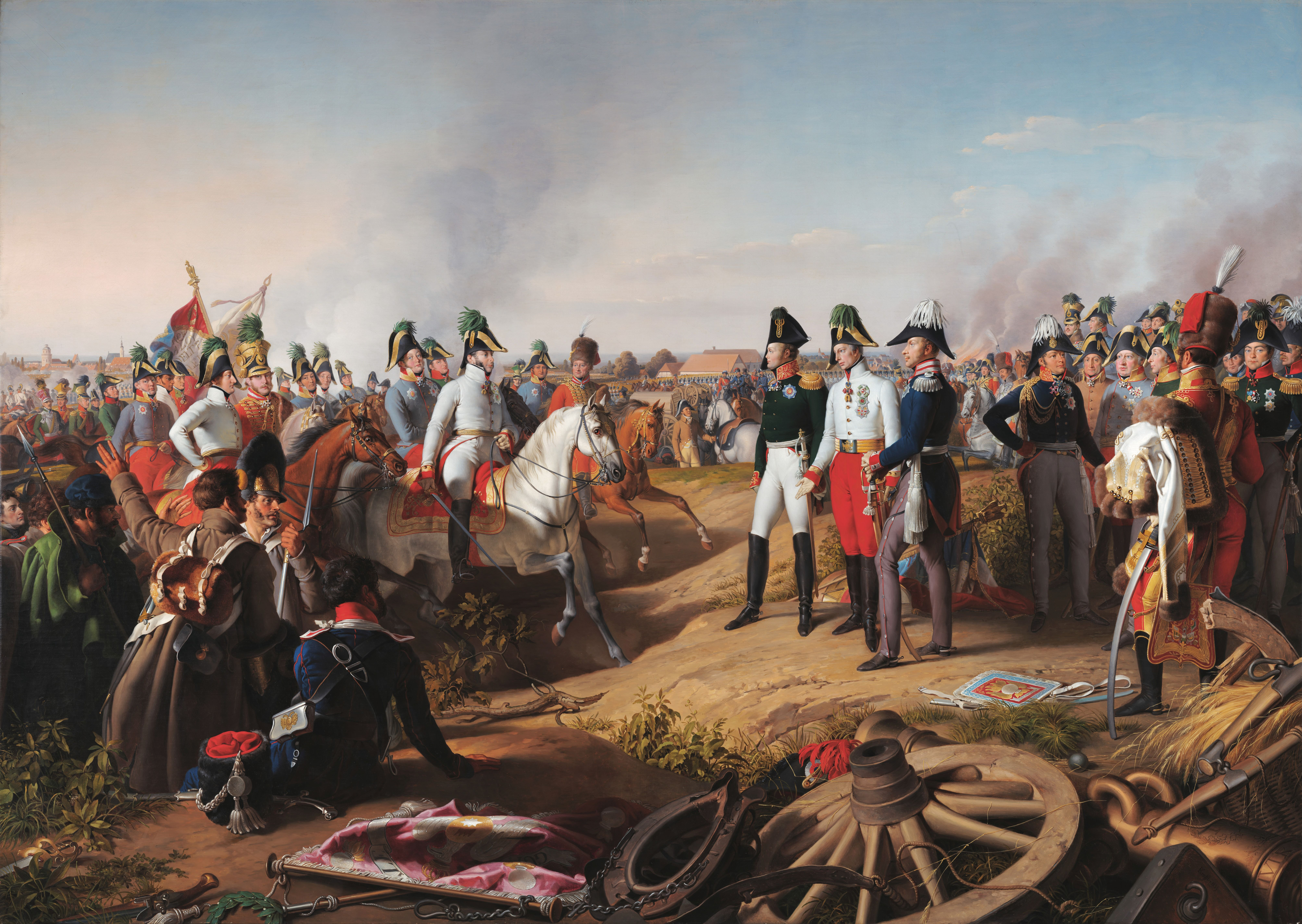
Karl von Schwarzenberg and the three allied monarchs after the Battle of Leipzig, 1813 (The Declaration of Victory After the Battle of Leipzig by Johann Peter Krafft)

Austria's allies saw the declaration as an admission that Austria's diplomatic ambitions had failed, but Metternich viewed it as one move in a much longer campaign. For the rest of the war he strove to hold the Coalition together and, as such, to curb Russian momentum in Europe. To this end he won an early victory as an Austrian general, the Prince of Schwarzenberg, was confirmed supreme commander of the Coalition forces rather than Tsar Alexander I. He also succeeded in getting the three allied monarchs (Alexander, Francis and Prussia's Frederick William III) to follow him and their armies on campaign. With the Treaty of Töplitz, Metternich allowed Austria to remain uncommitted over the future of France, Italy, and Poland. He was still confined, however, by the British, who were subsidizing Prussia and Russia (in September Metternich requested subsidies for Austria as well). Meanwhile, the Coalition forces took the offensive. On 18 October 1813 Metternich witnessed the successful Battle of Leipzig and, two days later, he was rewarded for his "wise direction" with the rank of prince (German: Fürst). Metternich was delighted when Frankfurt was retaken in early November and, in particular, by the deference the Tsar showed Francis at a ceremony organised there by Metternich. Diplomatically, with the war drawing to a close, he remained determined to prevent the creation of a strong, unified German state, even offering Napoleon generous terms in order to retain him as a counterweight. On 2 December 1813 Napoleon agreed to talk, though these talks were delayed by the need for the participation of a more senior British diplomat, Viscount Castlereagh.

Before talks could begin, Coalition armies crossed the Rhine on 22 December. Metternich retired from Frankfurt to Breisgau to celebrate Christmas with his wife's family before travelling to the new Coalition headquarters at Basel in January 1814. There were quarrels with Tsar Alexander, particularly over the fate of France. (Note: At this time, the Russians favoured a new monarchy under Jean Bernadotte, while Austria favoured keeping the Bonaparte-Habsburg dynasty, if not under Napoleon himself (Palmer 1972, p. 112).) This rivalry intensified in January, prompting Alexander to storm out. He therefore missed the arrival of Castlereagh in mid-January. Metternich and Castlereagh formed a good working relationship and then met with Alexander at Langres. The Tsar remained unaccommodating however, demanding a push into the centre of France; but he was too preoccupied to object to Metternich's other ideas, like a final peace conference in Vienna. Metternich did not attend talks with the French at Châtillon, as he wanted to stay with Alexander. The talks stalled, and, after a brief advance, Coalition forces had to retreat after the Battle of Montmirail and Battle of Montereau. This relieved Metternich's fears that an overconfident Alexander might act unilaterally.

You have no idea what sufferings the people at headquarters impose upon us! I cannot stand it much longer and the Emperor Francis is already ill. [The other leaders] are all mad and belong in the lunatic asylum.

— Metternich to Stadion (Palmer 1972, p. 116)

Metternich continued negotiations with the French envoy Caulaincourt through early to mid March 1814, when victory at the Battle of Laon put the Coalition back on the offensive. By this time Metternich was tiring of trying to hold the Coalition together, and even the British-engineered Treaty of Chaumont did not help. In the absence of the Prussians and Russians the Coalition agreed to the restoration of the Bourbon dynasty. Francis rejected a final plea from Napoleon that he would abdicate in favour of his son with Marie Louise as regent, and Paris fell on 30 March. Military manoeuvres had forced Metternich westward to Dijon on 24 March and now, after a deliberate delay, he left for the French capital on 7 April. On 10 April he found a city at peace and, much to his annoyance, largely in the control of Tsar Alexander. The Austrians disliked the terms of the Treaty of Fontainebleau that Russia had imposed on Napoleon in their absence, but Metternich was reluctant to oppose them and on 11 April signed the treaty. Thereafter he focused on safeguarding Austrian interests in the forthcoming peace; asserting Austria's influence in Germany over that of Prussia; and undoing Russian ascendancy. For these reasons he ensured that the Italian provinces of Lombardy and Venetia, lost to French client states in 1805, were duly re-annexed as the Kingdom of Lombardy–Venetia.

On the division of formerly French-occupied Poland and Germany, Metternich was more confined by the interests of the Allies. After two failed proposals, advanced by the Prussians, the issue was postponed until after a peace treaty had been signed. Elsewhere, Metternich, like many of his counterparts, was anxious to provide the renewed French monarchy with the resources to maintain control. The generous Treaty of Paris was signed on 30 May. Now free, Metternich accompanied Tsar Alexander to England; Wilhelmine, who had followed Metternich to Paris, also made the crossing. A triumphant Metternich filled his four weeks with revelry, re-establishing his reputation and that of Austria; he was also awarded an honorary law degree from the University of Oxford. By contrast and to Metternich's pleasure, Alexander was ill-mannered and often insulting. Despite the opportunities, little diplomacy took place; instead, all that was firmly agreed was that proper discussions would take place at Vienna, with a date tentatively set for 15 August. When the Tsar tried to postpone it to October Metternich agreed but effected conditions that prevented Alexander from exercising any advantage due to his de facto control of Poland. Metternich was eventually reunited with his family in Austria in the middle of July 1814, having stopped for a week in France to soothe fears surrounding Napoleon's wife Marie Louise, now the Duchess of Parma. His return to Vienna was celebrated by an occasional cantata that included the line "History holds thee up to posterity as a model among great men".

=== Congress of Vienna ===
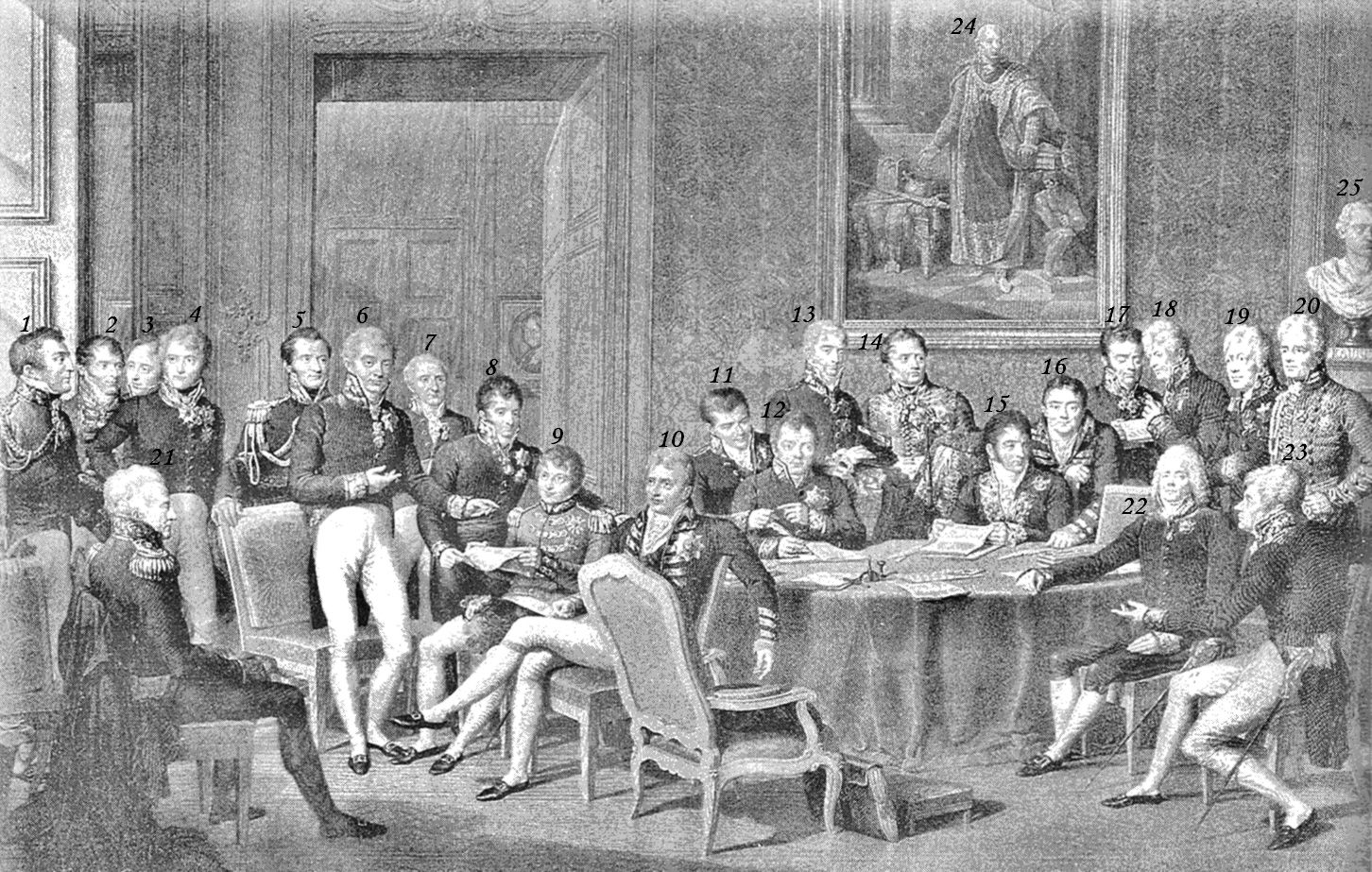
Metternich alongside Wellington, Talleyrand and other European diplomats at the Congress of Vienna, 1815

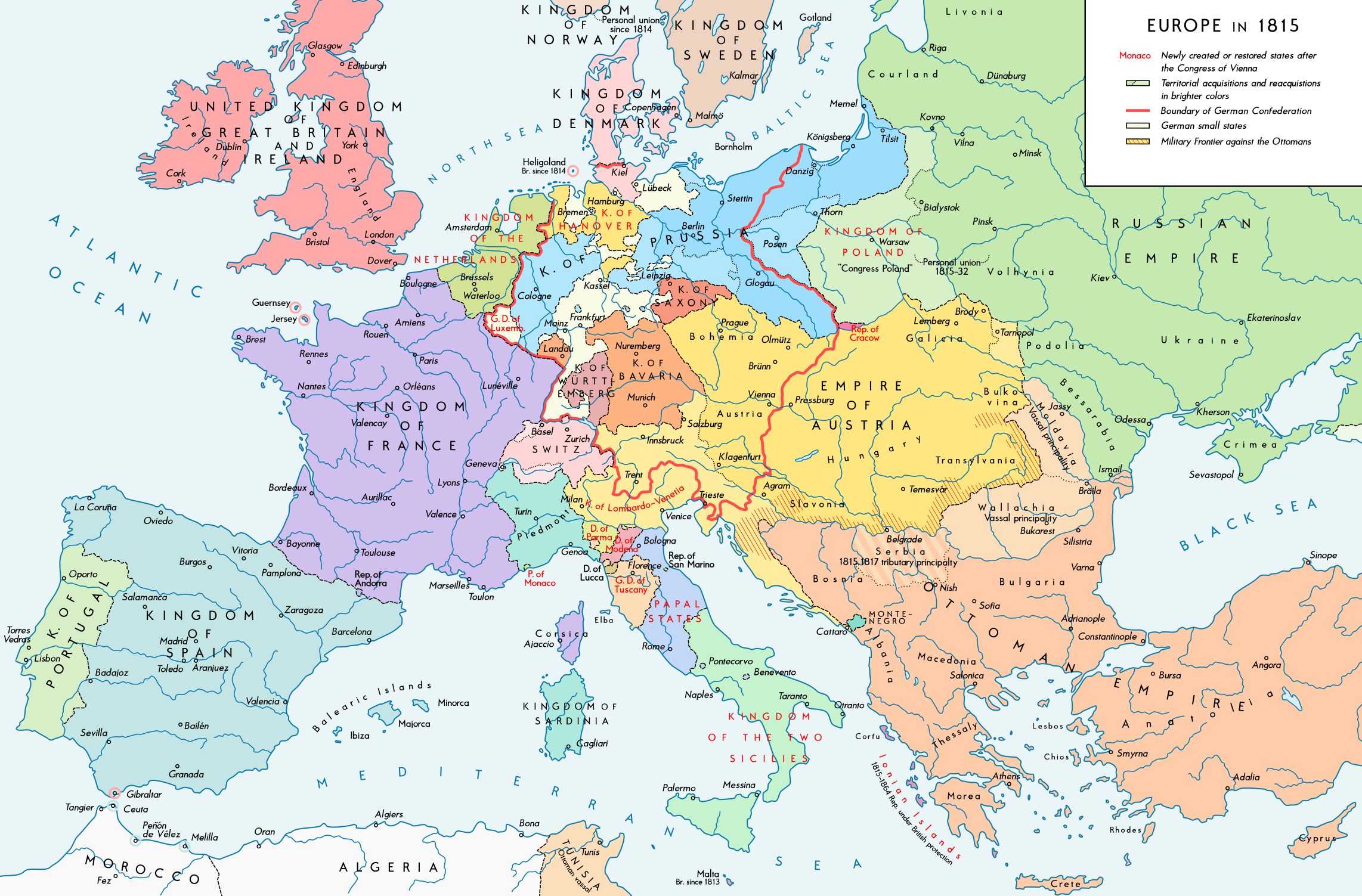
The national boundaries within Europe set by the Congress of Vienna

In the autumn of 1814, the heads of the five reigning dynasties and representatives from 216 noble families began gathering in Vienna. Before ministers from the "Big Four" (the Coalition allies of Britain, Austria, Prussia and Russia) arrived, Metternich stayed quietly in Baden bei Wien, two hours to the south. When he heard they had reached Vienna he journeyed to meet them and encouraged them to go with him back to Baden. They declined, and four meetings were held in the city itself. In these, the representatives agreed on how the Congress would operate and, to Metternich's delight, named his own aide Friedrich von Gentz secretary to the negotiations of the "Big Six" (the Big Four plus France and Spain). When Talleyrand and Spanish representative Don Pedro Labrador learned of these decisions, they were incensed that agreements were negotiated by the Big Four only. Sweden and Portugal were similarly angered by their exclusion from all but the full Congress, especially since Metternich was determined to give the latter grouping as little power as possible. As a result, the Big Six became the Preliminary Committee of the Eight, whose first decision was that the congress itself be postponed to 1 November. In fact, it would soon be postponed again, with only a minor commission beginning work in November. In the meantime, Metternich organised a controversially vast array of entertainments for the delegates including himself.

Leaving Castlereagh to negotiate on Tsar Alexander's behalf, Metternich briefly turned his attention to quelling anti-Habsburg feeling in Italy. Around the same time, he learnt that the Duchess of Sagan was courting the Tsar. Disappointed, and exhausted by social rounds, Metternich let his guard drop, angering Tsar Alexander during negotiations over Poland (still formally ruled by Napoleon's ally Frederick Augustus of Saxony as the Duchy of Warsaw) by implying Austria could match Russia militarily. Despite the blunder, Francis refused to dismiss his foreign minister, and political crisis rocked Vienna throughout November, culminating in a declaration by Tsar Alexander that Russia would not compromise in its claim on Poland as a satellite kingdom. The Coalition rejected this utterly, and the agreement seemed further off than ever. During the stand-off, it seems that Alexander even went as far as to challenge Metternich to a duel. However, Tsar Alexander soon did a rapid volte face and agreed to the division of Poland. He also softened in regard to the Germanic Kingdom of Saxony, and for the first time allowed Talleyrand to participate in all Big Four (now Big Five) discussions.

With the new consensus, the major issues concerning Poland and Germany were settled in the second week of February 1815. Austria gained land in the partition of Poland and prevented the Prussian annexation of Saxony, but was forced to accept Russian dominance in Poland and increasing Prussian influence in Germany. Metternich now focused on getting the various German states to cede historic rights to a new Federal Diet that could stand up to Prussia. He also assisted the Swiss Committee and worked on myriad smaller issues, like navigation rights on the Rhine. The beginning of Lent on 8 February brought him more time to devote to these congressional issues as well as private discussions about southern Italy, where Joachim Murat was said to be raising a Neapolitan army. On 7 March Metternich was awakened with the news that Napoleon had escaped from his island prison of Elba and within an hour had met with both the Tsar and the King of Prussia. Metternich wanted no rash change of course, and at first, there was little impact on the Congress. Finally, on 13 March the Big Five declared Napoleon an outlaw and the Allies began preparations for renewed fighting. On 25 March they signed a treaty committing each to send 150,000 men with little sign of their prior divisive stances. After the military commanders left, the Vienna Congress settled down to serious work, fixing the boundaries of an independent Netherlands, formalising proposals for a loose confederation of Swiss cantons, and ratifying earlier agreements over Poland. By late April only two major issues remained, the organisation of a new German federation and the problem of Italy.

The ministers and representatives of the German princes sent to the congress continue to sing the praises of Prince Metternich.... They admire the tact and circumspection with which he has handled the German committee.

— From the report of an agent of the Austrian intelligence service (Palmer 1972, pp. 147–148).

The latter soon began to come to a head. Austria had solidified its control over Lombardy-Venetia and extended its protection to provinces nominally under the control of Francis' daughter Marie Louise. On 18 April Metternich announced that Austria was formally at war with Murat's Naples. Austria won the Battle of Tolentino on 3 May and captured Naples less than three weeks later. Metternich then was able to delay a decision on the future of the country until after Vienna. Discussions about Germany would drag on until early June when a joint Austrian-Prussian proposition was ratified. It left most constitutional issues to the new diet; its president would be Emperor Francis himself. Despite criticism from within Austria, Metternich was pleased with the outcome and the degree of control it granted Habsburgs, and, through them, himself. Certainly, Metternich was able to use the diet to his own ends on numerous occasions. The arrangement was similarly popular with most German representatives. A summation treaty was signed on 19 June (the Russians signed a week later), bringing the Vienna Congress officially to an end. Metternich himself had left on 13 June for the front line, prepared for a lengthy war against Napoleon. Napoleon, however, was defeated decisively at the Battle of Waterloo on 18 June.

=== Paris and Italy ===
Map of Europe, highlighting the Holy Alliance, formed in 1815, in 1840

From 1815 onward, statesmen in Europe focused on averting the threat of social revolution because Napoleon had been defeated. Metternich published reform proposals. He envisaged the preservation of the existing social hierarchy and to this end the continuous authority of legitimate sovereigns as well as the rule of law. Metternich rose to become the foremost conservative statesman in Europe, his scrutiny lasted until 1848. The Habsburg rulers of the Austrian Empire bet that the idea of nationality would avert the doom.

Metternich was back with coalition allies in Paris, once more discussing peace terms. After 133 days of negotiations, longer than the Hundred Days turmoil itself, the second Treaty of Paris was concluded on 20 November. Metternich, of the opinion that France should not be dismembered, was happy with the result. France lost only a little land along its eastern borders, seven hundred million French francs, and the artworks it had plundered. It also accepted an army of occupation, numbering 150,000. In the meantime a separate treaty, proposed by Alexander and redrafted by Metternich, had been signed on 26 September. This created a new Holy Alliance centered on Russia, Prussia and Austria; it was a document Metternich neither pushed for nor wanted, given its vaguely liberal sentiments.

Representatives from most of the European states eventually signed, with the exception of the Papal States (the Pope), the United Kingdom, and the Ottoman Empire. Shortly afterwards, a separate treaty reaffirmed the Quadruple Alliance and established through its sixth article the Congress System of regular diplomatic meetings. With Europe at peace, the Austrian flag now flew over 50 percent more land than when Metternich had become Foreign Minister.

Metternich now returned to the question of Italy, making his first visit to the country in early December 1815. After visiting Venice, his family joined him in Milan on 18 December. For once it was Metternich playing the liberal, vainly urging Francis to give the region some autonomy. Metternich spent four months in Italy, endlessly busy and suffering chronic inflammation of the eyelids. He tried to control Austrian foreign policy from Milan and when there was a serious disagreement between the Empire and the Kingdom of Bavaria, was heavily criticised for his absence. His enemies could not capitalise on this, however. Stadion was occupied by his work as finance minister and the Empress Maria Ludovika of Austria-Este, a fierce critic of Metternich's policies, died in April.

The uncharacteristic gap between the views of Metternich and his emperor was eased only by the active compromise of proposals. Metternich returned to Vienna on 28 May 1816 after almost a year's absence. Professionally, the rest of 1816 passed quietly for the tired Minister, who was concerned with fiscal policy and monitoring the spread of liberalism in Germany and nationalism in Italy. Personally, he was shaken in November by the death of Julie Zichy-Festetics. Two years later he wrote that his "life ended there," and his old frivolity took some time to return. The only consolation was July's news that Metternich was to receive new estates along the Rhine at Johannisberg, only 25 miles (40 km) from his birthplace at Koblenz.

In June 1817 Metternich was required to escort the emperor's newlywed daughter Maria Leopoldina to a ship at Livorno. There was delay upon their arrival, and Metternich spent the time travelling around Italy again. He visited Venice, Padua, Ferrara, Pisa, Florence and Lucca. Though alarmed by developments he noted that many of Francis' concessions were still not in practice. But Metternich was optimistic and made another plea for decentralisation on 29 August. After this failed, Metternich decided to broaden his efforts into general administrative reform to avoid the appearance of favouring the Italians over the rest of the Empire. While working on this, he returned to Vienna on 12 September 1817 to be immediately caught up in the organisation of his daughter Maria's marriage to Count Joseph Esterházy just three days later. It proved too much, and Metternich was taken ill. After a delay for recovery, Metternich condensed his proposals for Italy into three documents he submitted to Francis, all dated 27 October 1817. The administration would remain undemocratic, but there would be a new Ministry of Justice and four new chancellors. Each with local remits, including one for "Italy". Importantly, the divisions would be regional, not national. In the end, Francis accepted the revised proposals, albeit with several alterations and restrictions.

=== Aachen, Teplice, Karlsbad, Troppau, and Laibach ===
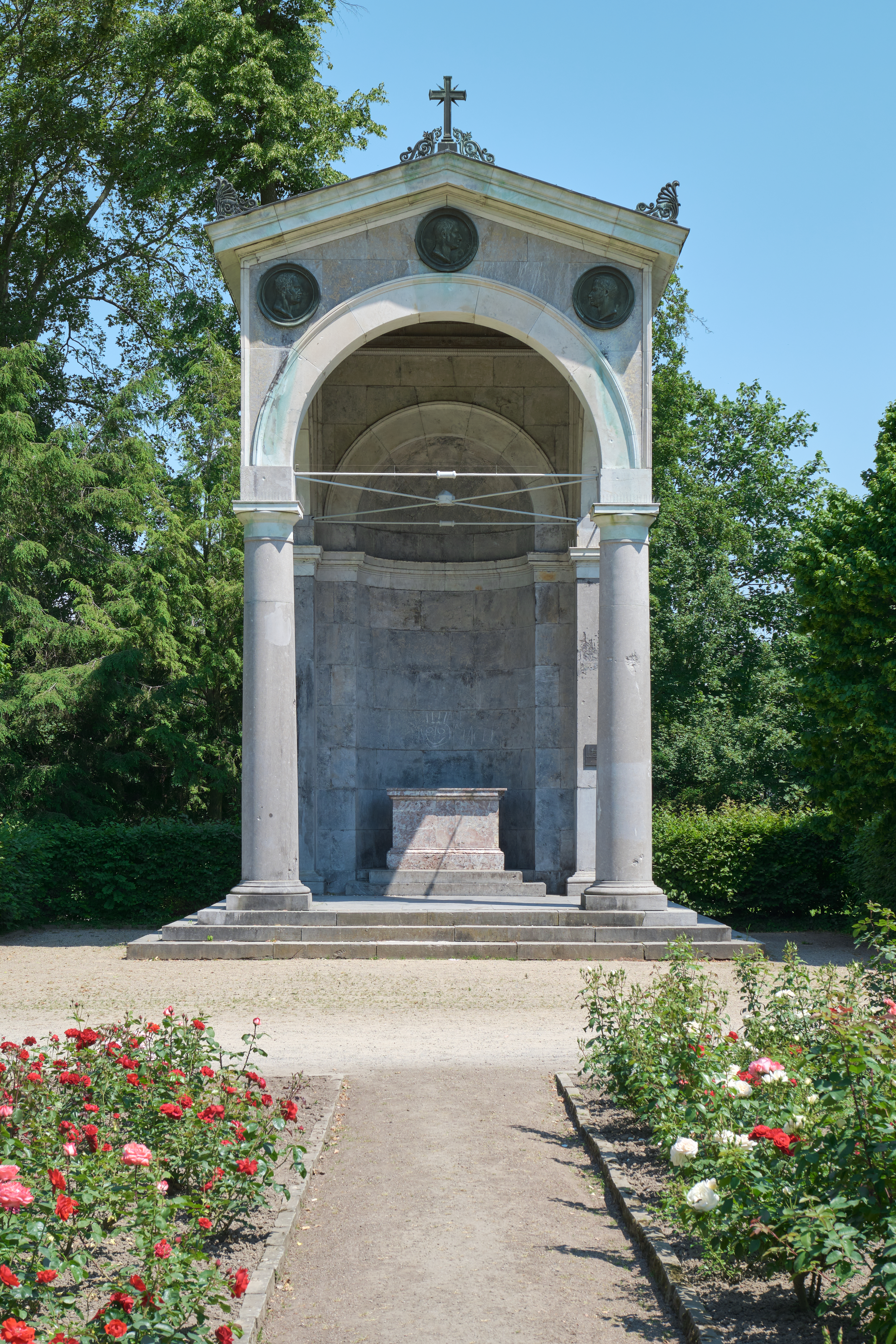
Congress memorial in Aachen

Metternich's primary focus remained on preserving unity among the Great Powers of Europe and hence his own power as mediator. He was also concerned by liberal-minded Ioannis Kapodistrias' increasing influence over Tsar Alexander and the continual threat of Russia annexing large areas of the declining Ottoman Empire (the so-called Eastern Question). As he had earlier envisaged, by April 1818 Britain had drawn up, and Metternich pushed through, proposals to have a Congress at Aachen, then a Prussian frontier town, six months later. Meanwhile, Metternich was advised to go to the spa town of Karlsbad to treat the rheumatic tension in his back. It was a pleasant month-long trip, although it was there he received news of the death of his father at the age of 72.

He visited the family estate at Königswart and then Frankfurt in late August to encourage the member states of the German Confederation to agree on procedural issues. Metternich could also now visit Koblenz for the first time in 25 years and his new estate at Johannisberg. Travelling with Emperor Francis, he was warmly greeted by the Catholic towns along the Rhine as he progressed towards Aachen. He had arranged in advance for newspapers to cover the first peacetime congress of its kind. As discussions began, Metternich pushed for the withdrawal of allied troops from France and means for preserving the unity of the European powers. The former was agreed almost immediately, but the latter agreement extended only to maintaining the Quadruple Alliance. Metternich rejected the Tsar's idealistic plans for (among other things) a single European army. His own recommendations to the Prussians for greater controls on freedom of speech was equally hard for other powers such as Britain to support openly.

Today the greatest evil—and therefore the most immediate—is the press.

— Metternich to Gentz, June 1819 (Palmer 1972, p. 182)

Metternich travelled with Dorothea Lieven to Brussels soon after the congress broke up, and although he could not stay more than a few days, the pair exchanged letters for the next eight years. He arrived in Vienna on 11 December 1818 and was finally able to spend considerable time with his children. He entertained the Tsar during the Christmas season and spent twelve weeks monitoring Italy and Germany before setting off with the Emperor on the third trip to Italy. The trip was cut short by the assassination of the conservative German dramatist August von Kotzebue. After a short delay, Metternich decided that if the German governments would not act against this perceived problem, Austria would have to compel them. He called an informal conference in Karlsbad and sounded out Prussian support beforehand by meeting with Frederick William III of Prussia in Teplitz in July. Metternich carried the day, using a recent attempt on the life of the Chief Minister of Nassau, Carl Ibell to win agreement for the conservative program now known as the Convention of Teplitz. The Karlsbad conference opened on 6 August and ran for the rest of the month. Metternich overcame any opposition to his proposed "group of anti-revolutionary measures, correct and preemptory", although they were condemned by outsiders. Despite censure Metternich was very pleased with the result, known as the Carlsbad Decrees.

At the conference in Vienna later in the year, Metternich found himself constrained by the Kings of Württemberg and Bavaria to abandon his plans to reform the German Confederation. He now regretted having so quickly forced through its original constitution five years before. Nevertheless, he held ground on other issues and the Conference's Final Act was highly reactionary, much as Metternich had envisaged it. He remained in Vienna until the close in May 1820, finding the whole affair a bore. On 6 May he heard of the death of his daughter Princess Klementine von Metternich from tuberculosis. Journeying on to Prague, he heard that his eldest daughter Maria had also contracted the disease. He was at her bedside in Baden bei Wien when she died on 20 July. This prompted Eleonore and the remaining children to leave for the cleaner air of France.

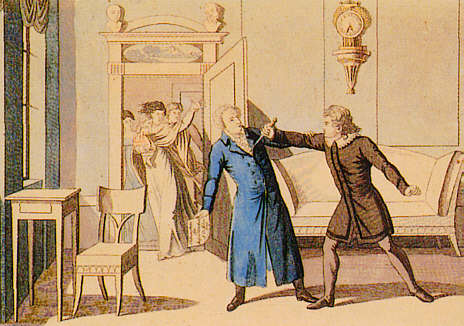
The murder of August von Kotzebue in 1819 was an opportunity for Metternich to fight against the opposition.

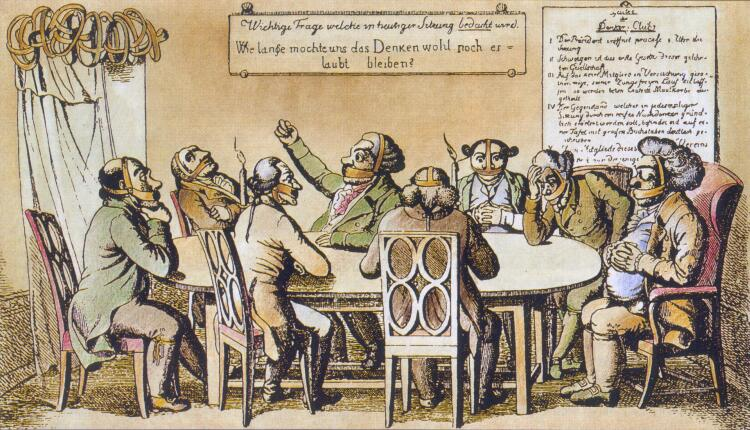
A contemporary lithograph mocking the new restrictions on the press and free expression imposed by the Carlsbad Decrees

The rest of 1820 was filled with liberal revolts to which Metternich was expected to respond. Ultimately, the Austrian Foreign Minister was torn between following through on his conservative pledge (a policy favoured by the Russians) and keeping out of a country in which Austria had no interest (favoured by the British). He chose "sympathetic inactivity" on Spain (Note: Metternich succeeded in preventing proposals for a French-led invasion only by rendering Tsar Alexander fearful of a French conspiracy (Palmer 1972, p. 199).) but, much to his dismay and surprise, Guglielmo Pepe led a revolt in Naples in early July and forced King Ferdinand I to accept a new constitution. Metternich reluctantly agreed to attend the Russian-initiated Congress of Troppau in October to discuss these events. He need not have worried: the Tsar gave way and accepted a compromise proposal of moderate interventionism laid down in the Troppau Protocol. Still worried by Kapodistrias' influence over the Tsar, he laid down his conservative principles in a long memorandum, including an attack on the free press and the initiative of the middle classes.

The Congress disbanded in the third week of December, and the next step would be a congress at Laibach to discuss intervention with Ferdinand. Metternich found himself able to dominate Laibach more than any other congress, overseeing Ferdinand's rejection of the liberal constitution he had agreed to only months before. Austrian armies left for Naples in February and entered the city in March. The Congress was adjourned but, forewarned or by luck, Metternich kept representatives of the powers close at hand until the revolt was put down. As a result, when similar revolts broke out in Piedmont in the middle of March, Metternich had the Tsar at hand, who agreed to send 90,000 men to the frontier in a show of solidarity. Concerns grew in Vienna that Metternich's policy was too expensive. He responded that Naples and Piedmont would pay for stability; nonetheless, he, too, was clearly worried for the future of Italy. He was relieved when able to create a Court Chancellor and Chancellor of State on 25 May, a post left vacant since the death of Kaunitz in 1794. He was also pleased at the renewed (if fragile) closeness between Austria, Prussia and Russia; however, it had come at the expense of the Anglo-Austrian entente.

== Chancellor ==
=== Hanover, Verona, and Czernowitz ===
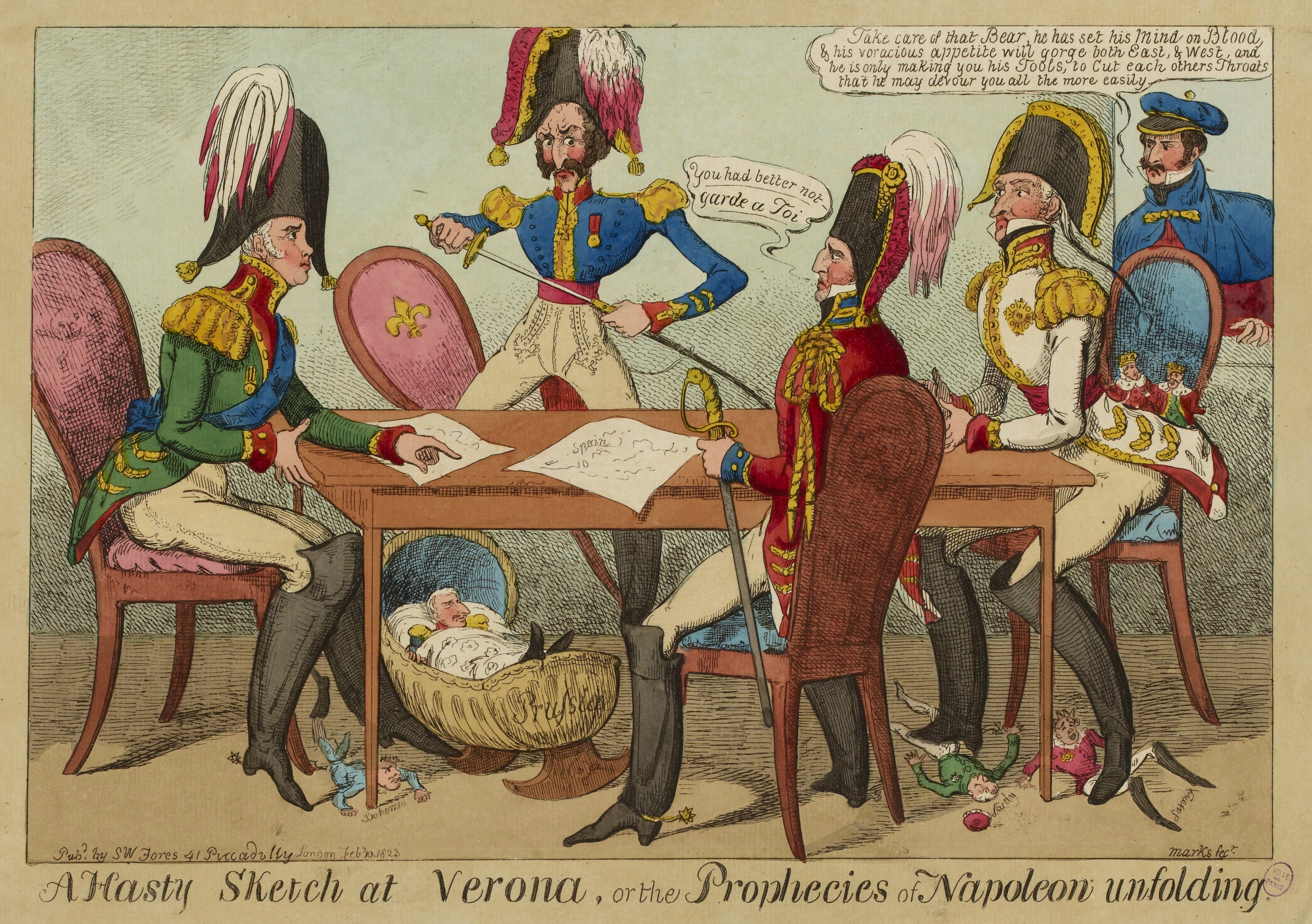
Cartoon from the Congress of Verona (1822)

In 1821, while Metternich was still at Laibach with Tsar Alexander, the revolt of Prince Alexander Ypsilantis threatened to bring the Ottoman Empire to the brink of collapse. Wanting a strong Ottoman Empire to counterbalance Russia, Metternich opposed all forms of Greek nationalism. Before Alexander returned to Russia, Metternich secured his agreement not to act unilaterally and would write to the Tsar, again and again, asking him not to intervene. For extra support he met with Viscount Castlereagh (now also Marquess of Londonderry) and King George IV of the United Kingdom in Hanover in October. The warmness of Metternich's welcome was sweetened by his promise to settle in part Austria's financial debts to Britain. The earlier Anglo-Austrian entente was thus restored, and the pair agreed that they would support the Austrian position concerning the Balkans. Metternich went away happy, not least because he had met Dorothea Lieven once more.

Over Christmas, the Tsar wavered more than Metternich had expected and sent Dmitry Tatishchev to Vienna in February 1822 for talks with Metternich. Metternich soon convinced the "conceited and ambitious" Russian to let him dictate events. In return Austria promised to support Russia in enforcing its treaties with the Ottomans if the other alliance members would do likewise; Metternich was aware this was politically impossible for the British. Metternich's adversary at the Russian court, Kapodistrias, retired from service there; however, by the end of April there was a new threat: Russia now determined to intervene in Spain, action Metternich described as "utter nonsense". He played for time, convincing his ally Castlereagh to come to Vienna for talks before a scheduled congress in Verona, although Castlereagh died by suicide on 12 August. With Castlereagh dead and relations with the British weakening, Metternich had lost a useful ally. The Congress of Verona was a fine social event but diplomatically less successful. Supposedly concerned with Italy, the Congress had to focus on Spain instead. Austria urged non-intervention, but it was the French that carried the day with their proposal for a joint invasion force. Prussia committed men, and the Tsar pledged 150,000. Metternich worried about the difficulties of transporting such numbers to Spain and about French ambitions, but still pledged (if only moral) support for the joint force.

He lingered in Verona until 18 December, then spending some days in Venice with the Tsar and then by himself in Munich. He returned to Vienna in early January 1823 and remained until September; after Verona, he travelled much less than before, partly because of his new post as Chancellor and partly because of his declining health. He was buoyed by the arrival of his family from Paris in May. He shone once more in Viennese society. Politically, the year was one of disappointments. In March the French crossed the Pyrenees unilaterally, undoing the "moral solidarity" established at Verona. Likewise, Metternich thought the new Pope Leo XII too pro-French, and there was trouble between Austria and several German states over why they had not been included at Verona. Furthermore, Metternich, in discrediting the Russian diplomat Pozzo di Borgo, instead renewed the Tsar's former suspicion of him. Worse came in late September: while accompanying the Emperor to a meeting with Alexander at Czernowitz, Metternich fell ill with a fever. He could not continue and had to make do with brief talks with the Russian Foreign Minister, Karl Nesselrode. At the Czernowitz talks, in Metternich's absence, an impatient Tsar asked for a congress in the then Russian capital Saint Petersburg to discuss the Eastern Question. Metternich, wary of letting the Russians dominate affairs, could only play for time.

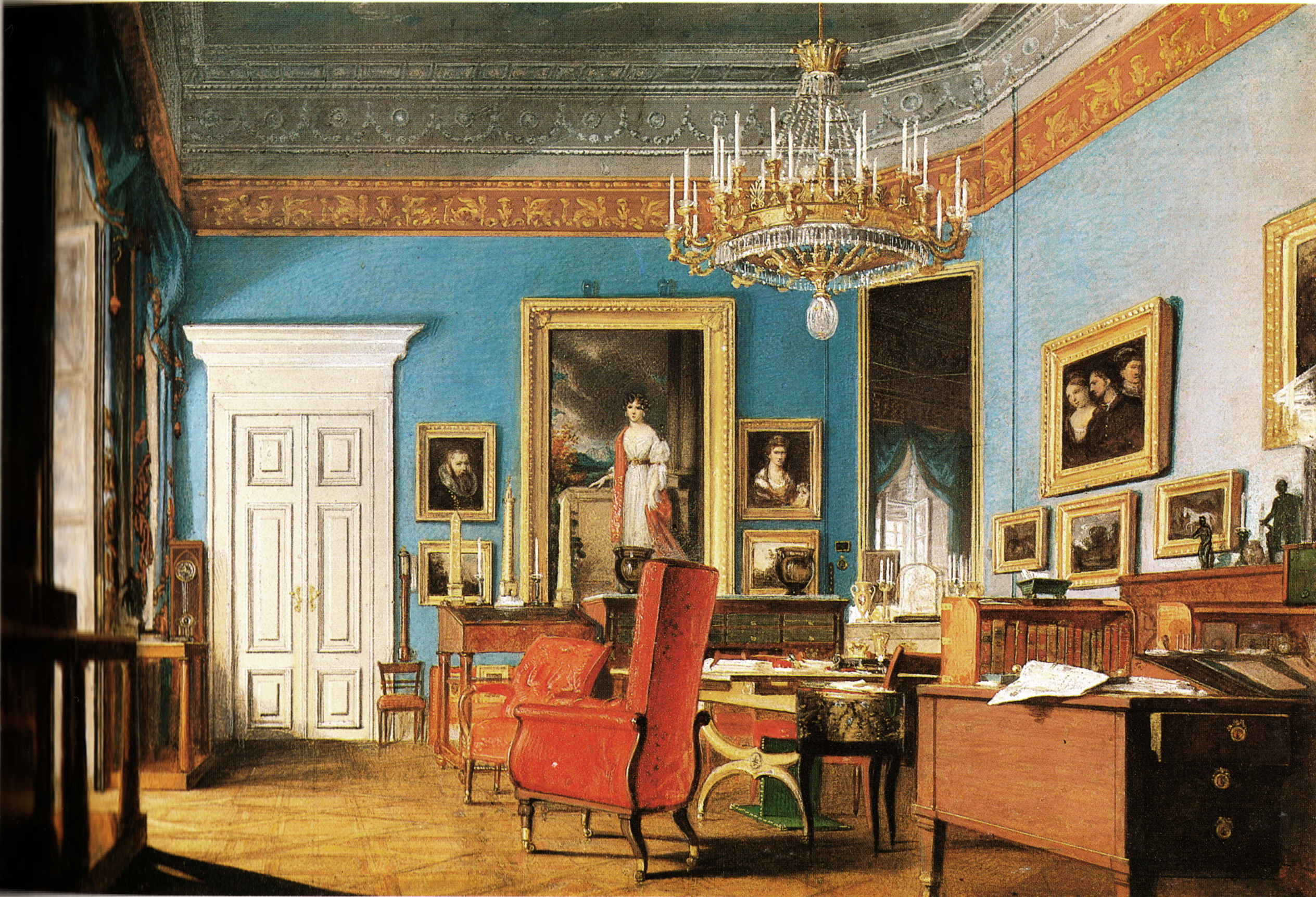
Office Prince Clemens von Metternich 1829

The Tsar's dual proposal for the St Petersburg meetings, a settlement of the Eastern Question favourable to Russia and limited autonomy for three Greek principalities, was a pairing unpalatable to the other European powers, and potential attendees like British Foreign Secretary George Canning slowly turned away, much to the annoyance of Alexander. Metternich believed for several months afterward that he had gained a unique level of influence over the Tsar. Meanwhile, he renewed the conservative program he had outlined at Karlsbad five years before and sought to further increase Austrian influence over the German Federal Diet. He also informed the press they could no longer publicise the minutes of Diet meetings, only its rulings. In January 1825 he began to worry about his wife Eleonore's health and he reached her sickbed in Paris shortly before her death on 19 March. Mourning sincerely for her, he also took the opportunity to dine with the Paris elite. An aside he made about the Tsar there was reported back and did not enhance his reputation. He left Paris for the last time on 21 April and was joined by the Emperor in Milan after arriving on 7 May. He declined the Pope's invitation to become a cardinal of the church. There was also a short trip to Genoa. Early in July the court dispersed and Metternich visited his daughters Leontine (fourteen) and Hermine (nine) in the quiet town of Bad Ischl. Despite the seclusion, he received constant reports, including those of ominous developments in the Ottoman Empire, where the Greek revolt was rapidly being crushed by Ibrahim Ali of Egypt. He also had to deal with the fallout from St. Petersburg where the Tsar, although unable to convene a full congress, had talked with all the major ambassadors. By mid-May it was clear the allies could not decide on a course of action and, as such, the Holy Alliance was no longer a viable political entity.

=== Hungarian Diets, Alexander I's death, and problems in Italy ===
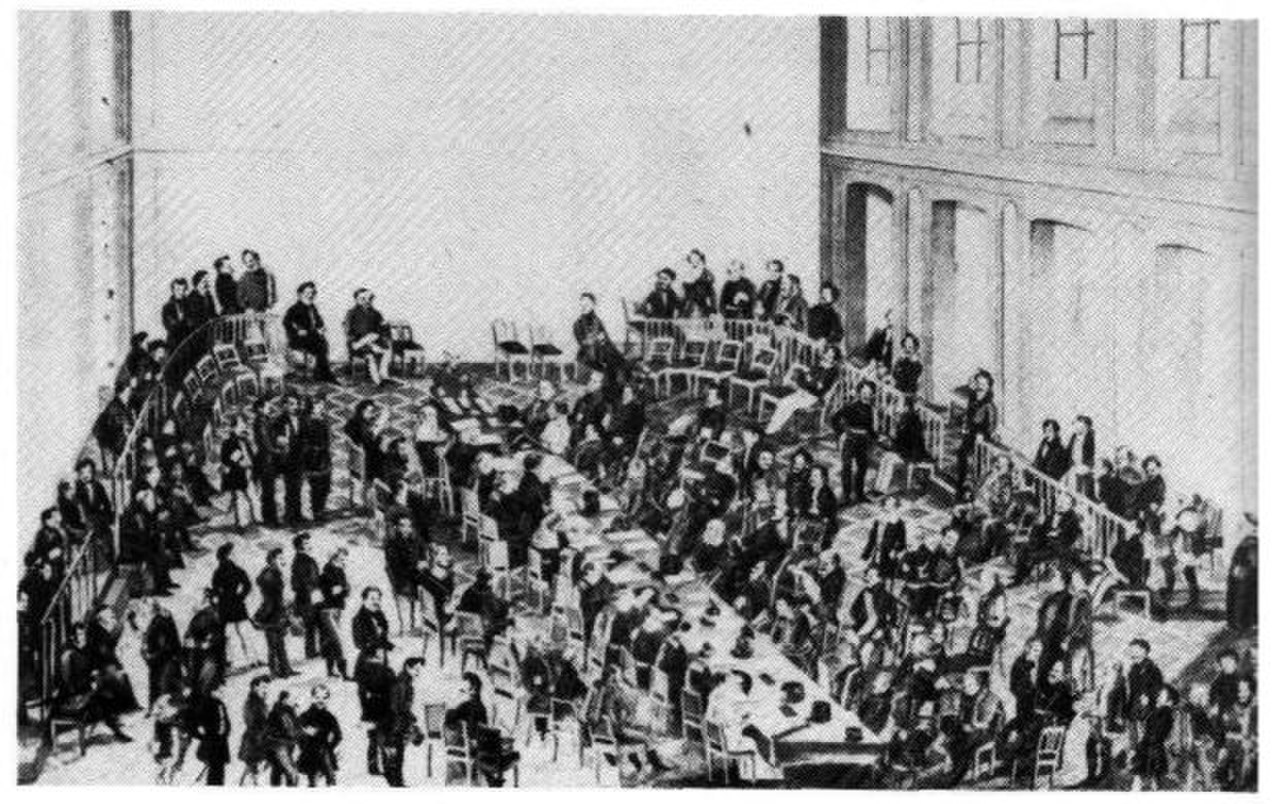
Diet of Hungary of 1830

In the early 1820s, Metternich had advised Francis that convening the Hungarian Diet would help get approval for financial reform. In fact, the Diet of 1825 to 1827 saw 300 sessions filled with criticism of how the Empire had eroded the historic rights of the Kingdom of Hungary's nobility. Metternich complained that it "interfered with [his] time, [his] customs and [his] daily life", as he was forced to travel to Bratislava to perform ceremonial duties and to observe. He was alarmed by the growth of Hungarian national sentiment and wary of the growing influence of nationalist István Széchenyi, whom he had met twice in 1825. Back in Vienna, in mid-December, he heard of the death of Tsar Alexander with mixed feelings. He had known the Tsar well and was reminded of his own frailty, although the death potentially wiped the soured diplomatic slate clean. Moreover, he could claim credit for foreseeing the liberal Decembrist revolt the new Tsar Nicholas I had to crush. Now 53, Metternich chose to send Archduke Ferdinand to establish the first contact with Nicholas. Metternich was also friendly with the British envoy (the Duke of Wellington) and enlisted his help to charm Nicholas. Despite this, the first 18 months of Nicholas' reign did not go well for Metternich: firstly, the British were chosen over the Austrians to oversee Russian-Ottoman talks; (Note: Britain and Austria both wished to avoid war, but the British Foreign Secretary Canning wanted an autonomous Greek state. This would be the topic of mediation with the Ottomans. Metternich, on the other hand, was resolutely opposed to courting instability by redrawing any borders in Eastern Europe (Palmer 1972, pp. 236–237).) and, as a result, Metternich could exercise no influence over the resulting Akkerman Convention. France too began to drift away from Metternich's non-interventionist position. In August 1826 Russian Foreign Minister Nesselrode rejected a proposal by Metternich to convene a congress to discuss the events that eventually led to the outbreak of civil war in Portugal. The Austrian Foreign Minister accepted this with "surprising resilience". On 29 March 1827 Metternich spoke and attended the funeral of Beethoven whom he may have met during the Congress of Vienna despite Beethoven being one of Metternich's harshest critics.

On 5 November 1827 Baroness Antoinette von Leykam (1806-1829), the daughter of a diplomat Christoph Ambros Freiherr von Leykam (1777–1830), Chamberlain of the Grand Duke of Baden, and his Neapolitan wife, Donna Lucia Antonia Caputo dei Marchesi della Petrella (b.1783), former mistress of Ferdinand I of the Two Sicilies, became Metternich's second wife. They met in Vienna, at a ball given by Sir Henry Wellesley, who served as British ambassador to Austria. Antoinette was only twenty, and their marriage, a small affair at Hetzendorf (a village just outside Vienna), drew considerable criticism considering their difference in status. She belonged to the lower nobility, but Antoinette's grace and charm soon won over Viennese high society. The same day British, Russian and French forces destroyed the Ottoman fleet at the Battle of Navarino. Metternich worried that further intervention would topple the Ottoman Empire, upsetting the balance so carefully created in 1815. To his relief, the new British Prime Minister Wellington and his cabinet were equally fearful of giving Russia the upper hand in the Balkans. After another round of his proposals for congresses was rejected, Metternich stood back from the Eastern Question, watching as the Treaty of Adrianople was signed in September 1829. Though he publicly criticised it for being too harsh on Turkey, privately he was satisfied with its leniency and promise of Greek autonomy, making it a buffer against Russian expansion rather than a Russian satellite state. Metternich's private life was filled with grief. In November 1828 his mother died, and in January 1829 Antoinette died, five days after giving birth to their son, Richard von Metternich. After fighting tuberculosis for many months, Metternich's son Viktor, then a junior diplomat, died on 30 November 1829. Consequently, he spent Christmas alone and depressed, worried by the draconian methods of some of his fellow conservatives and by the renewed march of liberalism.

My whole life's work is destroyed.

— Metternich on hearing of France's July Revolution (Palmer 1972, p. 246).

In May Metternich took a much-needed holiday on his estate at Johannisberg. He returned to Vienna a month later, still worried by the "chaos in London and Paris" and his declining ability to prevent it. Hearing Nesselrode was due to take the waters at Karlsbad, he met him there in late July. He berated the quiet Nesselrode, but no offence was taken. The two arranged a second meeting in August. In the interim Metternich heard of France's July Revolution, which deeply shocked him and theoretically posed the need for a congress of the Quadruple Alliance. Instead, Metternich met with Nesselrode as planned and, while the Russian rejected his plan to restore the old Alliance, the pair agreed on the Chiffon de Karlsbad: that panic was needless unless the new government showed territorial ambitions in Europe. Although pleased by this, Metternich's mood was soured by news of unrest in Brussels (then part of the United Kingdom of the Netherlands), the resignation of Wellington in London, and calls for constitutionality in Germany. He wrote with sombre and "almost morbid relish" that it was the "beginning of the end" of Old Europe. Nonetheless, he was heartened by the fact that the July Revolution had made a Franco-Russian alliance impossible and that the Netherlands had called an old-style congress of the sort he enjoyed so much. The 1830 convocation of the Hungarian Diet was also more successful than past ones, crowning Archduke Ferdinand as King of Hungary with little dissent. Moreover, by November his betrothal to 25-year-old Countess Melanie Zichy-Ferraris, who came from a Magyar family the Metternichs had long known, was agreed upon. The announcement caused far less consternation in Vienna than Metternich's previous bride, and they were married on 30 January 1831.

In February 1831 rebels took the cities of Parma, Modena and Bologna and appealed to France for help. Their former rulers appealed for help from Austria, but Metternich was anxious not to march Austrian troops into the Papal States without authorisation from the new Pope Gregory XVI. He occupied Parma and Modena, however (both ruled by Habsburgs), and eventually did cross into Papal territory. As a result, Italy was pacified by the end of March. He authorised troop withdrawal from the Papal States in July, but by January 1832 they were back to put down a second rebellion. By now Metternich was ageing noticeably: his hair was grey and his face drawn and sunken, although his wife still enjoyed his company. In February 1832 a daughter, also Melanie, was born; in 1833 a son, Klemens, though he died aged two months; in October 1834 a second son, Paul; and in 1837 his third with Melanie, Lothar. Politically, Metternich had a new adversary, Lord Palmerston, who had taken over at the British Foreign Office in 1830. By the end of 1832, they had clashed on virtually every issue. "In short," Metternich wrote, "Palmerston is wrong about everything". Mostly, Metternich was annoyed by his insistence that under the 1815 agreements Britain had the right to oppose Austria's tightening of university controls in Germany, as Metternich had done again in 1832. Metternich also worried that if future congresses were held in Britain, as Palmerston wanted, his own influence would be significantly reduced.

=== Eastern Question revisited and peace in Europe ===
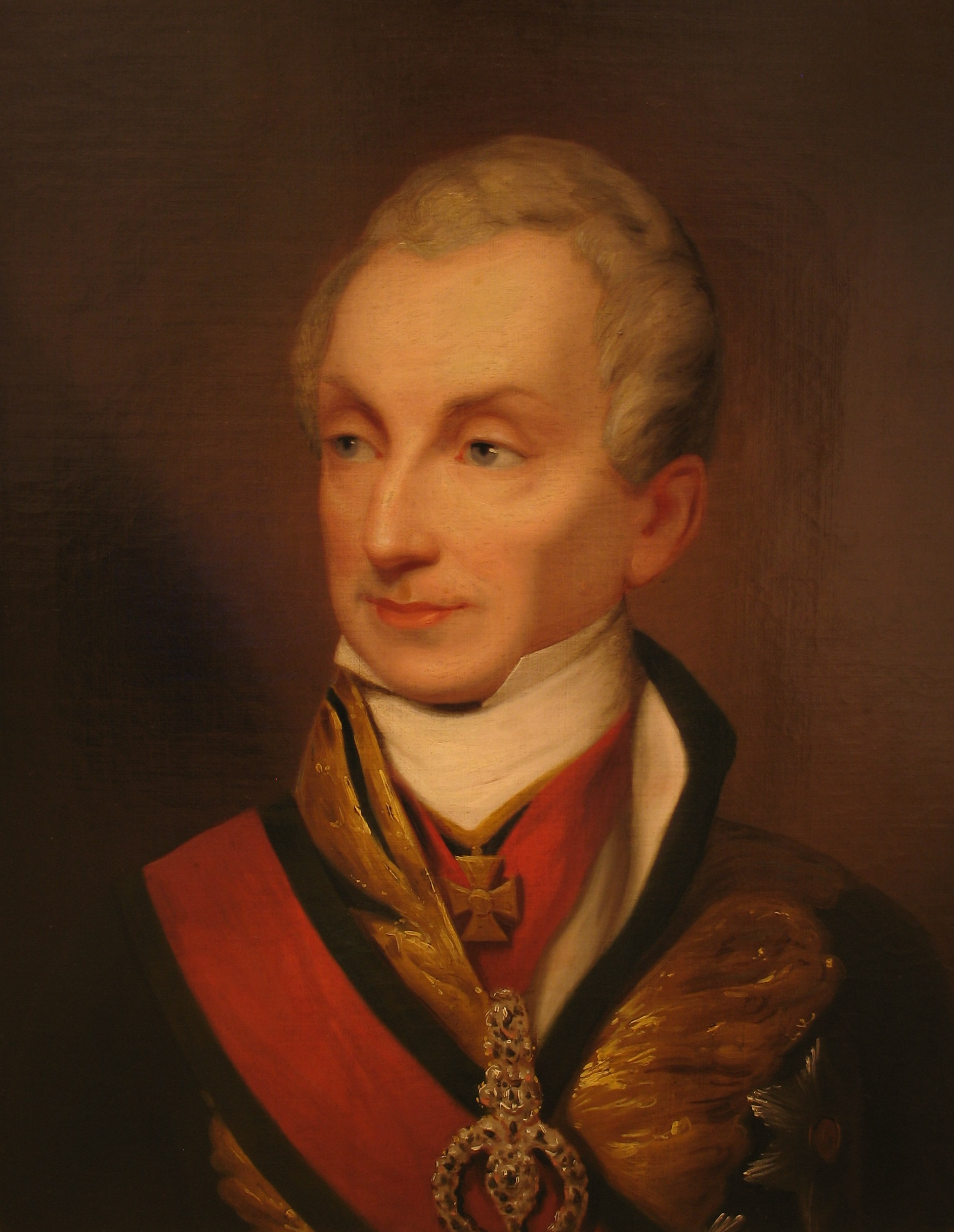
Metternich in a painting thought to date to between 1835 and 1840

In 1831 Egypt invaded the Ottoman Empire. There were fears of the Empire's total collapse, by which Austria stood to gain little. Metternich therefore proposed multilateral support for the Ottomans and a Viennese Congress to sort out details, but the French were evasive and the British refused to support any congress held in Vienna. By mid-1833 Anglo-Austrian relations had hit a new low. With Russia Metternich was more confident of exerting influence. He was mistaken, however, and left to observe from afar Russian intervention in the region culminating in the Treaty of Hünkâr İskelesi. He still arranged to meet with King Frederick William III of Prussia at Teplitz and accompany Francis to meet Tsar Nicholas at Münchengrätz in September 1833. The former meeting went well: Metternich still felt able to dominate the Prussians, despite their rising economic prominence in Europe through the Zollverein. The latter was more strained but, as Nicholas warmed, three Münchengrätz Agreements were reached that shaped a new conservative league to uphold the existing order in Turkey, Poland, and elsewhere. Metternich left happy; his sole disappointment was having to commit to being tougher on Polish nationalists. Almost immediately, he heard of the creation of the Quadruple Alliance of 1834 between Britain, France, Spain and Portugal. This alliance of liberals was such an affront to Austrian values that Palmerston wrote he "should like to see Metternich's face when he reads our treaty". It did indeed draw bitter condemnation, mostly because it provided the occasion for an outbreak of war. Metternich tried two tacks: to intrigue for the removal of the British Foreign Secretary and to attempt (vainly) to build up cross-power bloc agreements. Palmerston did indeed leave office in November, but only temporarily and not by any of Metternich's attempts. Large-scale war, however, had been avoided and the Quadruple Alliance was beginning to disintegrate.

On 2 March 1835, Emperor Francis died, succeeded by his epileptic son Ferdinand I. Despite the widespread opinion that Ferdinand was a "ghost of a monarch", Metternich valued legitimacy highly and worked to keep the government running. He soon accompanied Ferdinand on his first meeting with Tsar Nicholas and the King of Prussia, again at Teplitz. Ferdinand was overwhelmed, especially as the delegations paraded into Prague. Overall, however, it was an untroubled meeting. The next few years passed relatively peacefully for Metternich: diplomatic incident was limited to the occasional angry exchange with Palmerston and Metternich's failure to be a mediator between the British and Russians over their Black Sea dispute. He also put effort into bringing new technology like the railways into Austria. The most pressing issue was Hungary, where Metternich remained reluctant to support the centrist (but still nationalist) Széchenyi. His hesitancy is "a sad commentary on his declining powers of political presence". At court Metternich increasingly lost power to the rising star Franz Anton von Kolowrat-Liebsteinsky, particularly in his proposals to increase military budgets. After his failed attempt in 1836 to force constitutional reform (which would have afforded him greater influence)—largely thwarted by the more liberally minded Archduke John—Metternich was forced to share more power with Kolowrat and Archduke Ludwig as part of Austria's Secret State Conference. Decision making ground to a halt. Entertaining and maintaining his estates at Johannisberg, Königswart and Plasy (together with Mariánská Týnice) were consuming much of his resources at a time when he had four young children to support, causing him more stress.

Reception of Grand Duke Alexander Nikolayevich by Prince Metternich in the Vienna Hofburg in 1839

Metternich had long predicted a new crisis in the East, and when the Egyptian-Ottoman War broke out in 1839 he was anxious to re-establish Austria's diplomatic credentials. He quickly gathered representatives in Vienna, whence on 27 July they issued a communiqué to Istanbul pledging support. However, Tsar Nicholas sent Metternich a message from St Petersburg challenging Vienna's claim to diplomatic centrality. Metternich worked so furiously that he fell ill, spending the next five weeks resting at Johannisberg. The Austrians lost the initiative, and Metternich had to accept that London would be the new centre of negotiations over the Eastern Question. Just three weeks after its creation, Metternich's European League of Great Powers (his diplomatic response to aggressive moves by French Prime Minister Adolphe Thiers) had become a mere curiosity. Little, too, was heard of his proposals to hold a congress in Germany. A separate attempt to strengthen the influence of ambassadors stationed in Vienna was also rejected. This set the tone for the rest of Metternich's chancellorship. His illness had, it seemed to others, broken his love of being in office. Over the next decade, his wife prepared quietly for his retirement or death in office. Metternich's work during the early 1840s was dominated again by Hungary and, more generally, questions of national identity within the diverse Austrian Empire. Here, Metternich "showed [moments of] acute perception". His Hungarian proposals came far too late, however, as Lajos Kossuth had already led the rise of strong Hungarian nationalism. Metternich's support for other nationalities was patchy since he only opposed those that threatened the unity of the Empire.

At the Conference of State Metternich lost his principal ally Count Karl von Clam-Martinic (1792-1840) in 1840, which furthered the growing paralysis at the heart of Austrian government. Metternich now struggled to enforce even the level of censorship he desired. There were no major challenges to the regime from outside. Italy was quiet, and neither Metternich's attempt to lecture the new Prussian king Frederick William IV nor the boredom of the new British Queen Victoria at their first meeting posed immediate problems. Far more worrying was Tsar Nicholas, whose estimation of the Habsburg dynasty and Austria was low. After an impromptu tour of Italy in 1845, the Tsar unexpectedly stopped in Vienna. Already in a bad mood, he was an awkward guest, though in between criticisms of Austria he reassured Metternich that Russia was not about to invade the Ottoman Empire again. Two months later their countries were required to work together over the Galician slaughter and a declaration of independence by the Free City of Cracow. Metternich authorised the occupation of the city and the use of troops to restore order in surrounding areas, intent on undoing the pseudo-independence that had been granted Kraków in 1815. After months of negotiations with Prussia and Russia, Austria annexed the city in November 1846. Metternich regarded it as a personal victory, but it was an act of dubious utility: not only were Polish dissidents now officially part of Austria, the Europe-wide Polish dissident movement was now worked actively against the "Metternich system" that had overridden the rights enshrined in 1815. Britain and France appeared similarly outraged, although calls for Metternich's resignation were ignored. For the next two years, Ferdinand could not abdicate in favour of his nephew without a regency; Metternich believed Austria would need him in the interim to hold the government together.

== Revolution ==
Revolutions of 1848 in Europe

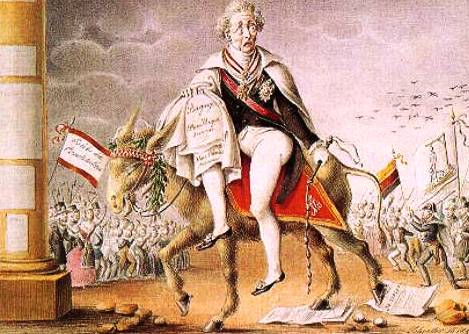
Caricature on Metternich's escape from March 1848

Though Metternich was tiring, memoranda kept pouring forth from his chancellery. Despite this, he did not foresee the building crisis. The new Pope Pius IX was gaining a reputation as a liberal nationalist, counterbalancing Metternich and Austria; at the same time, the Empire experienced unemployment and rising prices as a result of poor harvests. Metternich was bemused at the outcry from Italians, the Pope, and Palmerston when he ordered the occupation of Papal-controlled Ferrara in mid-1847. Despite securing French agreement for the first time in years from François Guizot over the Swiss Civil War, France and Austria were forced into backing breakaway cantons. The pair proposed a conference, but the government crushed the revolt. It was a major blow to Metternich's prestige, and his opponents in Vienna called it evidence of his incompetence. In January 1848 Metternich predicted trouble in Italy during the year ahead. (Note: Sicily erupted in revolution only a fortnight later, but it was Rome he had pinpointed as the epicentre of future trouble (Palmer 1972, pp. 298–311).) He acted on this by dispatching an envoy, Karl Ludwig von Ficquelmont to Italy; by resurrecting his 1817 plans for an Italian chancellery; and by arranging various contingency plans with the French. In late February Austrian field marshal Joseph Radetsky placed Austrian Italy (Lombardy-Venetia) under martial law as disturbances spread. Despite this and hearing of renewed revolution in France, Metternich was cautious, still thinking domestic revolution unlikely. He was described by a Saxon diplomat as, in the words of biographer Musulin, "having shrunk to a shadow of his former self".

I am no longer anybody... I have nothing more to do, nothing more to discuss.

— Metternich after resigning (Palmer 1972, p. 313).

On 3 March Kossuth gave a fiery speech in the Hungarian Diet, calling for a constitution. It was not until 10 March that Metternich appeared concerned about events in Vienna, where there were now threats and counter-threats flying. Two petitions were organised, calling for greater freedom, transparency, and representation. Students were involved in several demonstrations, culminating on 13 March when they cheered the imperial family but voiced anger at Metternich. After a customary morning, Metternich was called to meet with Archduke Ludwig soon after midday. The Chancellor had troops sent into the streets while also announcing a prearranged and minimal concession. In the afternoon the crowd turned hostile, and a division of troops opened fire on it, killing five. The mob was now truly incited, as the liberals were joined by underprivileged Viennese set on wreaking havoc. The students offered to form a pro-government Academic Legion if their demands were met. Ludwig was eager to accept and told Metternich he must resign, to which he reluctantly agreed. After sleeping in the Chancellery he was advised to either take back his resignation or leave the city. After Ludwig sent him a message to the effect that the government could not guarantee his safety, Metternich left for the house of Count Taaffe and then, with aid from friends Charles von Hügel and Johann Rechberg, reached the family seat of Prince Liechtenstein forty miles away at Feldsberg. Metternich's daughter Leontine joined them on 21 March and suggested England as a haven; agreeing, Metternich, Melanie and 19-year-old Richard set out, leaving the younger children with Leontine. Metternich's resignation had been met with cheering in Vienna, and even the Viennese commoners welcomed the end of Metternich's era of social conservatism.

== Exile, return, and death ==
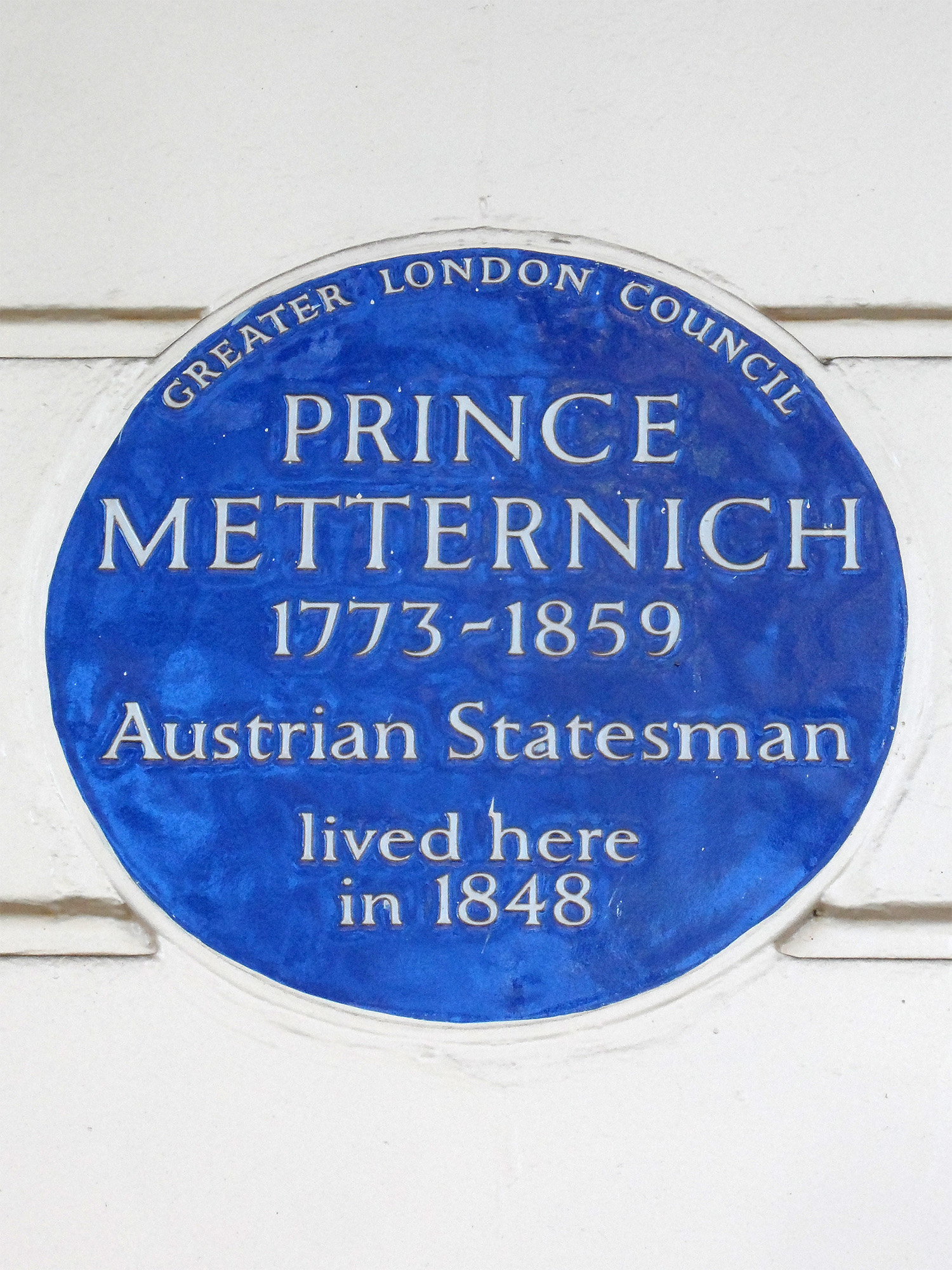
Blue plaque in Eaton Square commemorating one of Metternich's London residences during his exile

After an anxious journey of nine days during which they were honoured in some towns and refused entry to others, Metternich, his wife, and son Richard arrived in the Dutch city of Arnhem. They stayed until Metternich regained his strength, then reached Amsterdam and The Hague, where they waited to hear the results of a demonstration by British chartists, planned for 10 April. On 20 April they landed at Blackwall in London, where they stayed in the Brunswick Hotel in Hanover Square for a fortnight until they found a permanent residence. Metternich largely enjoyed his time in London: the Duke of Wellington, now nearly eighty, tried to keep him entertained, and there were also visits from Palmerston, Guizot (now also in exile) and Benjamin Disraeli, who enjoyed his political conversation. The sole disappointment was that Victoria herself did not acknowledge his presence in the capital. The trio leased a house, 44 Eaton Square, for four months. The younger children joined them in the summer. He followed events in Austria from afar, famously denying ever having erred; in fact, he declared the turmoil in Europe to be a vindication of his policies. In Vienna, a hostile post-censorship press continued to attack him; in particular, they accused him of embezzlement and accepting bribes, prompting an investigation. Metternich was eventually cleared of the more extreme charges, and searches for evidence of the lesser ones came up empty-handed. (In all likelihood Metternich's large expense claims were merely a product of the necessities of early 19th-century diplomacy.) Meanwhile, as he was denied his pension, Metternich was ironically reliant on loans.

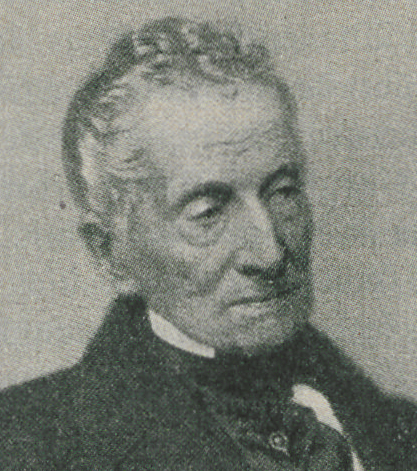
Photograph of Prince Metternich in old age

In mid-September, the family moved to 42 Brunswick Terrace, Brighton, on the south coast of England where the tranquillity of life contrasted greatly with revolutionary Europe left behind. Parliamentary figures, particularly Disraeli, travelled down to visit them, as did Metternich's former friend Dorothea Lieven (Melanie led a reconciliation between the two). Expecting a visit from Metternich's daughter Leontine and her own daughter Pauline, the family moved to a suite of rooms at Richmond Palace on 23 April 1849. Visitors included Wellington, who still watched out for Metternich; Johann Strauss, the composer; and Dorothea de Dino, sister of Metternich's former lover Wilhemine of Sagan; (Note: Several biographers accept the young Pauline's testimony that it was actually Wilhemine who visited. This contradicts, however, the established date of Wilhemine's death—1839 (Palmer 1972, p. 322).) and former lover Catherine Bagration. Metternich was showing his age, and his frequent fainting was cause for worry. The ex-Chancellor was also depressed by the lack of communication from the new Emperor Franz Joseph I and his government. Leontine wrote to Vienna trying to encourage this contact, and in August Metternich received a warm letter from Franz Joseph; sincere or not, it buoyed Metternich considerably. From mid-August Melanie began to push for a move to Brussels, a city cheaper to live in and closer to continental affairs. They arrived in October, staying overnight in the Hotel Bellevue. With revolution subsiding, Metternich was hopeful they would return to Vienna. Their stay in fact lasted over 18 months while Metternich waited for an opportunity to re-enter Austrian politics. It was a pleasant enough (and cheap) stay, first in the Boulevard de l'Observatoire and later in the Sablon area—filled with visits from politicians, writers, musicians and scientists. For Metternich, however, the tedium and homesickness only increased. In March 1851 Melanie induced him to write to the new political force in Vienna, Prince Schwarzenberg, to ask if he might return if he promised not to interfere in public affairs. In April he received an affirmative reply, authorised by Franz Joseph.

In May 1851 Metternich left for his Johannisberg estate, which he had last visited in 1845. That summer Metternich enjoyed the company of Prussian representative Otto von Bismarck. He also enjoyed a visit from Frederick William IV, though the King irritated Metternich by appearing to cultivate him as a tool against Schwarzenberg. In September Metternich returned to Vienna, entertained along the way by various German princes keen to entertain the focus of Prussian intrigue. Metternich was reinvigorated, dropped his nostalgia, and lived in the present for the first time in a decade. Franz Josef asked for his advice on numerous issues (though he was too headstrong to be much influenced by it), and both of the two emerging factions in Vienna courted Metternich; even Tsar Nicholas called on him during a state visit. Metternich was not keen on the new Foreign Minister, Karl Ferdinand von Buol, but thought him sufficiently incompetent that he would be impressionable. Metternich's advice was of varying quality; nonetheless, some of it was usefully insightful, even in modern issues. Now deaf, Metternich wrote endlessly, particularly for an appreciative Franz Josef. He wanted Austrian neutrality in the Crimean War, though Buol did not. (Note: When Buol signed an alliance with the Western powers in December 1855—albeit one that did not commit troops—Metternich would have noted with regret how Buol had broken the bonds with Russia he had cultivated for so long (Palmer 1972, pp. 328–340).) In the meantime Metternich's health was slowly failing, and he was a more peripheral figure after the death of his wife Melanie in January 1854. In a brief resurgence of energy in early 1856, he busied himself in arrangements for a marriage between his son Richard and his granddaughter Pauline (Richard's step-sister's daughter) and undertook more travel. The King of the Belgians came to visit, as did Bismarck, and on 16 August 1857, he entertained the future Edward VII of the United Kingdom. Buol, however, was growing more resentful of Metternich's advice, particularly about Italy. In April 1859 Franz Josef came to ask him about what should be done in Italy. According to Pauline, Metternich begged him not to send an ultimatum to Italy, and Franz Josef explained that such an ultimatum had already been sent.

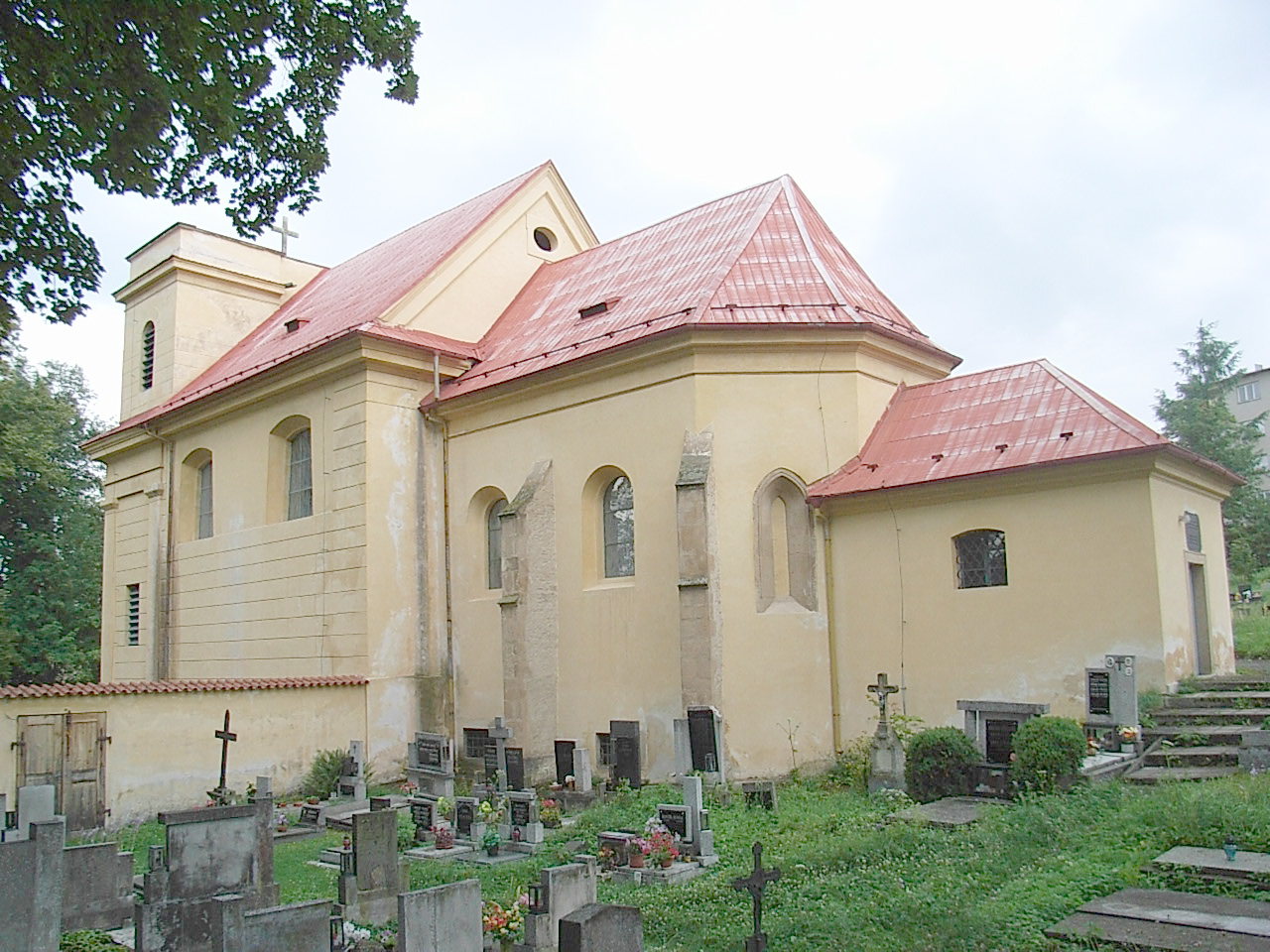
Cemetery Church of St. Wenceslaus in Plasy, Metternich's burial place

In this way, much to Metternich's disappointment and to Franz Josef's embarrassment, Austria began the Second Italian War of Independence against the combined forces of Piedmont-Sardinia and its ally France. Though Metternich was able to secure the replacement of Buol with his friend Rechberg, who had helped him so much in 1848, involvement in the war itself was now beyond his capacity. Even a special task given to him by Franz Josef in June 1859—to draw up secret papers addressing the event of Franz Josef's death—was now too taxing. Shortly afterwards Metternich died in Vienna on 11 June 1859, aged 86, and the last great figure of his generation. Almost everyone of note in Vienna came to pay tribute; in the foreign press, his death went virtually unnoticed.

== Historians' assessment ==
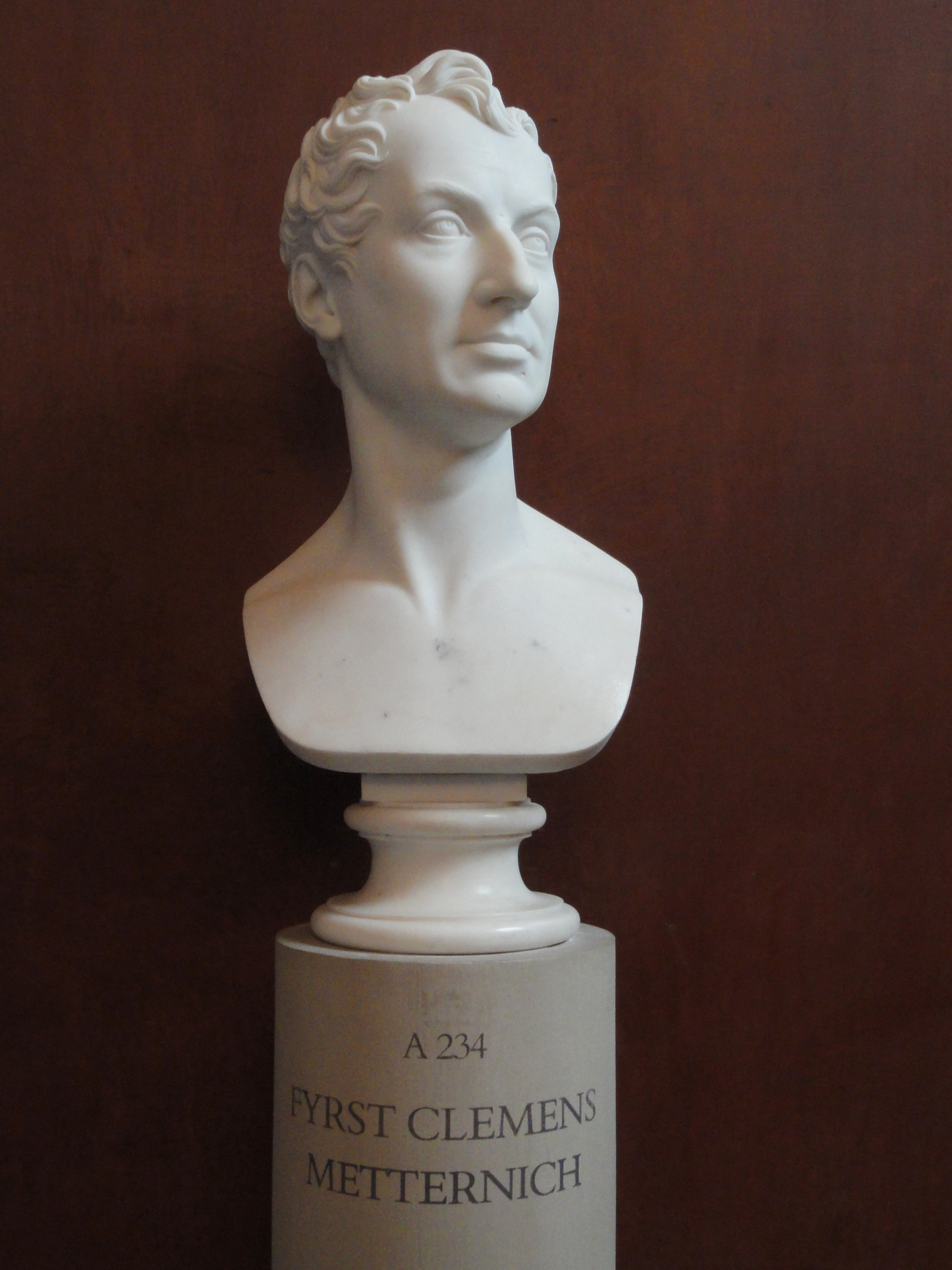
Sculpture in Thorvaldsen Museum, Copenhagen, Denmark. Sculptor: Bertel Thorvaldsen (c. 1770–1844).

Historians agree on Metternich's skill as a diplomat and his dedication to conservatism. According to Arthur May, he believed that:

the mass of Europeans yearned for security, quiet, and peace, and regarded liberal abstractions as repugnant or were utterly indifferent to them. The best of all patterns of government, he insisted, was autocratic absolutism, upheld by a loyal army, by a submissive, decently efficient bureaucracy and police machine, and by trustworthy churchmen.

Particularly during the remainder of the nineteenth century, Metternich was heavily criticised, decried as the man who prevented Austria and the rest of central Europe from "developing along normal liberal and constitutional lines". Had Metternich not stood in the way of "progress", Austria might have reformed, dealt better with its problems of nationality, and the First World War might never have happened. Instead, Metternich chose to fight an overwhelmingly fruitless war against the forces of liberalism and nationalism. Heavy censorship was just one of a range of repressive instruments of state available to him that also included a large spy network. Metternich opposed electoral reform, criticising Britain's 1832 Reform Bill. In short, he locked himself into an embittered battle against "the prevailing mood of his age".

On the other hand, Metternich's diplomacy and statesmanship became the focus of praise in the twentieth century from more favourably inclined historians, particularly biographer Heinrich von Srbik. For example, particularly after World War II, historians were more likely to defend Metternich's policies as reasonable attempts to achieve his goals, chiefly the balance of power in Europe. Sympathetic historians point out that Metternich correctly foresaw and worked to prevent Russian dominance in Europe, succeeding where his successors would fail 130 years later. As argued by Srbik, Metternich himself pursued legality, cooperation, and dialogue, and therefore helped ensure thirty years of peace, the "Age of Metternich". Authors like Peter Viereck and Ernst B. Haas also give Metternich credit for his more liberal ideals, even if they weighed relatively little in his overall policies.

Critical views presuppose Metternich had the ability to shape Europe favorably but chose not to. More modern critiques like that of A. J. P. Taylor have questioned how much influence Metternich actually wielded. Robin Okey, a critic of Metternich, noted that even in the realm of foreign affairs Metternich "had only his own persuasiveness to rely on", and this degraded over time. By this interpretation, his task was to create a "smokescreen" that hid Austria's true weakness. When it came to choosing a set of sound principles, wrote Taylor, "most men could do better while shaving." The result was that Metternich was no captivating diplomat: Taylor described him as "the most boring man in European history". Nor were his failures limited to foreign affairs, critics argue: at home he was equally powerless, failing to effect even his own proposals for administrative reform. In contrast, those who have attempted to rehabilitate Metternich describe him as "unquestionably [a] master of diplomacy", someone who perfected and indeed shaped the nature of diplomacy in his era. In a similar vein, Alan Sked argues that Metternich's "smokescreen" may well have served a purpose in furthering a relatively coherent set of principles.

== Issue ==
Metternich's children, grandchildren and great-grandchildren are (names are untranslated):

With Countess Maria Eleonore von Kaunitz-Rietberg (Note: Sister of Aloys von Kaunitz-Rietberg) (10 October 1775 – 19 March 1825), granddaughter of Wenzel Anton, Prince of Kaunitz-Rietberg:

- Maria Leopoldina (17 January 1797 – 24 July 1820), married on 15 September 1817 to Count Jozsef Esterházy von Galántha. No issue.
- Franz Karl Johann Georg (21 February 1798 – 3 December 1799).
- Klemens Eduard (10 June 1799 – 15 June 1799).
- Franz Karl Viktor Ernst Lothar Clemens Joseph Anton Adam (12 January 1803 – 30 November 1829); he had one illegitimate son with Claire Clemence Henriette Claudine de Maillé de La Tour-Landry, daughter of the 2nd Duc de Maillé:
  - Roger Armand Viktor Maurice, Baron von Aldenburg (21 October 1827 – 14 October 1906), unmarried.
- Klementine Marie Octavie (30 August 1804 – 6 May 1820).
- Leontine Adelheid Maria Pauline (18 June 1811 – 16 November 1861), married on 8 February 1835 to Count Moric Sándor de Szlavnicza. They had one daughter:
  - Pauline Klementine Marie Walburga Sándor de Szlavnicza (25 February 1836 – 28 September 1921), married on 13 June 1856 to her uncle Richard von Metternich.
- Hermine Gabriele (Henrietta) Marie Eleonore Leopoldine (1 September 1815 – December 1890), unmarried.

With Baroness Maria Antoinette von Leykam, Countess von Beylstein (15 August 1806 – 17 January 1829), daughter of Christoph Ambros Freiherr von Leykam (1781–1830) and his wife, Lucia Antonia Caputo dei Marchesi della Petrella (b. 1783):

- Richard Klemens Josef Lothar Hermann, 2nd Prince Metternich (7 January 1829 – 1 March 1895), married on 13 June 1856 to his niece Pauline Sándor de Szlavnicza. They had three daughters:
  - Sophie Marie Antoinette Leontine Melanie Julie (17 May 1857 – 11 January 1941), married 24 April 1878 to Prince Franz-Albrecht of Oettingen-Oettingen und Oettingen-Spielberg. They had three children:
    - Franz Albert Otto Richard Notger (2 September 1879 – 9 May 1895), Hereditary Prince of Oettingen-Oettingen in Oettingen-Spielberg.
    - Moritz Joseph Richard Notger (5 May 1885 – 4 October 1911), Hereditary Prince of Oettingen-Oettingen in Oettingen-Spielberg.
    - Princess Elisabeth Pauline Georgine Marie Notgera of Oettingen-Oettingen in Oettingen-Spielberg (31 October 1886 – 2 October 1976), married on 19 November 1910 to Prince Viktor III of Hohenlohe-Schillingsfürst-Breunner-Enkevoirth, Duke of Ratibor and Prince of Corvey.
  - Antoinette Pascalina (20 April 1862 – 5 August 1890), married on 11 July 1885 to Count Georg Wilhelm von Waldstein-Wartenberg. No issue.
  - Klementine Marie Melanie Sofie Leontine Crescentia (27 June 1870 – 25 October 1963), unmarried; she adopted Prince Franz Albrecht of Hohenlohe (born 1920; son of her niece Elisabeth), who assumed the title of Prince of Hohenlohe-Schillingsfürst-Metternich-Sándor.

With Countess Melania Maria Antonia Zichy-Ferraris de Zich et Vásonykeö (18 January 1805 – 3 March 1854), daughter of Count Ferenc Franz Zichy de Zich et Vásonkeö (1777–1839) and his wife, Countess Marie Wilhelmine von Ferraris (1780–1866):

- Melanie Marie Pauline Alexandrine (27 February 1832 – 16 November 1919), married on 20 November 1853 to Count Jozsef Zichy de Zich et Vásonykeö. No issue.
- Klemens (21 April 1833 – 10 June 1833).
- Paul Klemens Lothar, 3rd Prince Metternich (14 October 1834 – 6 February 1906), married on 9 May 1868 to his cousin Countess Melania Zichy-Ferraris de Zich und Vásonykeö. They had three children:
  - Klemens II Wenzel Lothar Michal Felix (Richard), 4th Prince Metternich (9 February 1869 – 13 May 1930), married on 4 October 1905 to Isabel de Silva y Carvajal. They had one son:
    - Paul II Alphonse Klemens Lothar Filip Neri Felix Nikomedes, 5th Prince Metternich (26 May 1917 – 21 September 1992), married on 6 September 1941 to Princess Tatiana Hilarionovna Wassiltchikova; he died without issue and the title of Prince Metternich became extinct.
  - Emilie Marie Felicitas (24 February 1873 – 20 January 1884).
  - Pauline Felix Maria (6 January 1880 – 19 May 1960), married on 5 May 1906 to Prince Maximilian Theodor of Thurn und Taxis. They had one daughter.
- Maria Emilia Stephanie (22 March 1836 – 12 June 1836).
- Lothar Stephan August Klemens Maria (13 September 1837 – 2 October 1904), married firstly on 21 April 1868 to Karoline Anna Rosalie Johanna Reittner, and secondly on 5 June 1900 to Countess Františka Mittrowsky von Mittrowitz. No issue in both marriages.

With Countess Katharina Skavronskaya, by marriage Princess Bagration (illegitimate, unacknowledged):

- Marie-Clementine Bagration (29 September 1810 – 29 May 1829), married on 1 May 1828 to Otto, Lensgraf von Blome. They had one son:
  - Otto Paul Julius Gustav (18 May 1829 – 24 August 1906), Lensgraf von Blome; married on 1 September 1858 to Joséphine, Countess von Buol-Schauenstein. They had nine children:
    - Countess Marie-Clementine Blome (23 June 1860 – died young).
    - Karl Otto Arnold (12 December 1861 – 5 September 1926), Lensgraf von Blome; married on 6 July 1907 to Countess Maria Hedwig Ida Leopolda Hermenegilde of Stolberg-Stolberg. No issue.
    - Countess Maria Sophie von Blome (23 November 1864 – died young).
    - Louis Pius Blome (1 December 1865 – 1930), Lensgraf von Blome.
    - Johannes Hubertus Xaverius (23 February 1867 – 19 July 1945), Lensgraf von Blome; married on 19 November 1901 to Princess Martha Elisabeth Maria Stirbey (1877–1925). They had one daughter.
    - Countess Maria Adeline von Blome (21 August 1868 – died young).
    - Countess Anna Maria von Blome (11 February 1871 – 9 January 1960), married in 1896 to Franz August Joseph Maria, Count von und zu Eltz genannt Faust von Stromberg. They had three children.
    - Countess Maria Giulia Sidonia von Blome (29 December 1873 – 7 January 1939), married in 1906 to Count Joseph von Plaz. They had three children.
    - Countess Maria Karola von Blome (16 January 1877 – 19 July 1951), a nun.

== Honours and arms ==
=== Honours ===
- Austrian Empire:
  - Grand Cross of the Royal Hungarian Order of St. Stephen, in Diamonds, 1805
  - Knight of the Golden Fleece, 1805
  - Golden Civil Cross "For Merit" (1813/1814)
  - Chancellor of the Military Order of Maria Theresa
- Kingdom of Bavaria: Knight of St. Hubert, 1813
- Kingdom of France:
  - Grand Cross of the Legion of Honour, 1814
  - Knight of the Holy Spirit, 30 May 1825
  - Knight of St. Michael
- Russian Empire:
  - Knight of St. Andrew, 27 August 1813
  - Knight of St. Alexander Nevsky, 27 August 1813
  - Knight of St. Anna, 1st Class, 27 August 1813
- Kingdom of Prussia:
  - Knight of the Black Eagle, 13 September 1813
  - Grand Cross of the Red Eagle, 13 September 1813
  - Pour le Mérite (civil), 31 May 1842
- Sweden: Knight of the Seraphim, 12 April 1814
- Denmark: Knight of the Elephant, 7 December 1814
- Kingdom of Sardinia: Knight of the Annunciation, 4 January 1815
- Baden: Grand Cross of the House Order of Fidelity, in Diamonds, 1815
- Kingdom of Saxony: Knight of the Rue Crown, 1815
- Kingdom of Hanover:
  - Grand Cross of the Royal Guelphic Order, 1816
  - Knight of St. George, 1841
- Duchy of Parma: Senator Grand Cross of the Constantinian Order of St. George, 1816
- Two Sicilies:
  - Knight of St. Januarius, 1816
  - Grand Cross of St. Ferdinand and Merit, 1816
  - Duke of Portella, 1818
- Electorate of Hesse: Grand Cross of the Golden Lion, 25 May 1817
- Spain:
  - Grand Cross of the Order of Charles III, with Collar, 20 October 1817
  - Grandee of the 1st Class, 1824
- Württemberg: Knight of the Golden Eagle, 1818
- Grand Duchy of Hesse: Grand Cross of the Ludwig Order, 5 February 1820
- Saxe-Weimar-Eisenach: Grand Cross of the White Falcon, 20 June 1820
- (Saxe-Coburg and Gotha) (Duchy of Saxe-Altenburg) (Saxe-Meiningen) Ernestine duchies: Grand Cross of the Saxe-Ernestine House Order, August 1835
- Ascanian duchies: Grand Cross of the Order of Albert the Bear, March 1837
- Belgium: Grand Cordon of the Order of Leopold
- Empire of Brazil: Grand Cross of the Southern Cross
- Brunswick: Grand Cross of the Order of Henry the Lion
- Kingdom of Greece: Grand Cross of the Redeemer
- Hohenzollern-Sigmaringen: Cross of Honour of the Princely House Order of Hohenzollern, 1st Class
- Holy See: Grand Cross of St. Gregory the Great
- Sovereign Military Order of Malta: Bailiff Grand Cross of Honour and Devotion
- Netherlands: Grand Cross of the Netherlands Lion
- Kingdom of Portugal:
  - Grand Cross of the Military Order of Christ
  - Grand Cross of the Tower and Sword
- Grand Duchy of Tuscany: Grand Cross of St. Joseph

=== Arms ===
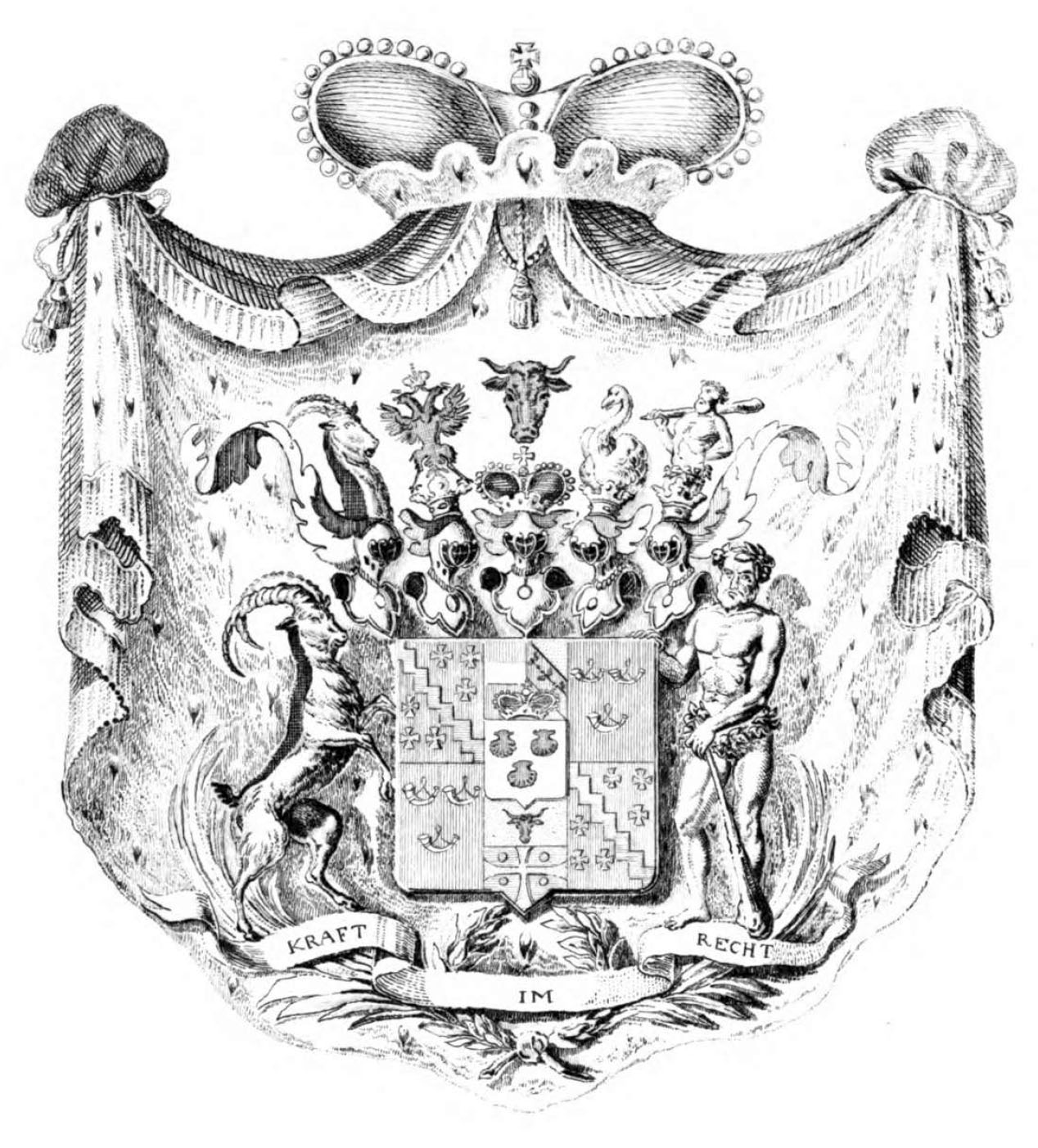
Metternich's coat of arms

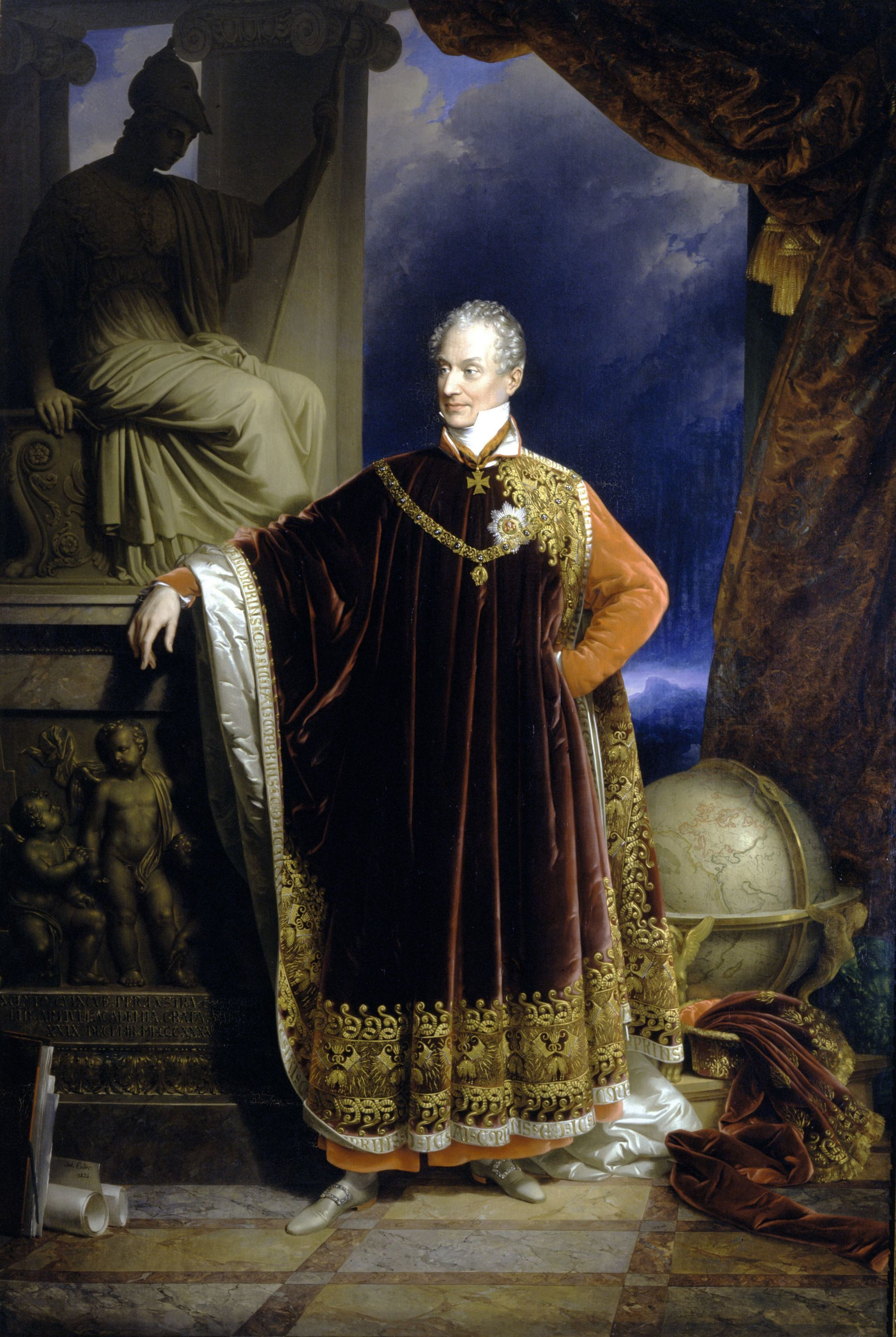
Portrait of Klemens von Metternich in 1836

== Other honours ==
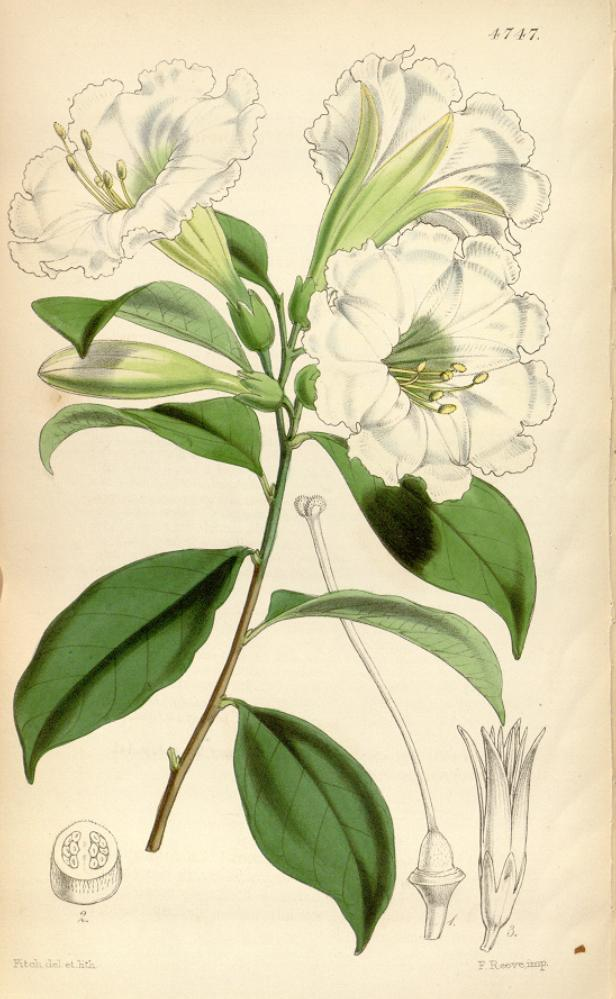
Illustration of Metternichia principis

In 1823, botanist J.C.Mikan published a genus of flowering plants from Brazil, belonging to the family Solanaceae as Metternichia in his honour.

== Ancestry ==
Ancestors of Klemens von Metternich

8. Dietrich Philipp Adolf, Count of Metternich-Winneburg
4. Johann Hugo, Count of Metternich-Winneburg
9. Baroness Maria Franziska Schenck von Schmidburg
2. Franz Georg Karl, Count of Metternich-Winneburg
10. Baron Karl Friedrich Melchior von Kesselstatt
5. Baroness Clara Luise von Kesselstatt
11. Baroness Isabella Maria Theresia Raitz von Frentz
1. Klemens, 1st Prince of Metternich-Winneburg zu Beilstein
12. Georg Sebastian Reinhard von Kageneck
6. Baron Johann Friedrich Fridolin von Kageneck
13. Baroness Maria Franziska Josefa von Ulm zu Erbach
3. Countess Maria Beatrix von Kageneck
14. Baron Johann Georg Baptist von Andlau-Birseck
7. Baroness Maria Anna Franziska Eleonore von Andlau
15. Ana Maria Katharina Truchsess von Wolhausen

== See also ==
- Metternich Stela
- Sachertorte

== Bibliography ==
- Bertier de Sauvigny, Guillaume de (1962). Metternich and His Times. Translated by Peter Ryde. London: Darton, Longman and Todd.
- Cecil, Algernon (1947). Metternich (3rd ed.). London: Eyre and Spottiswoode.
- Ford, Franklin L. (1971). Europe, 1780–1830. Hong Kong: Longman. ISBN 978-0-582-48346-0.
- Hamilton-Williams, David (1996). Waterloo New Perspectives: the Great Battle Reappraised. Wiley. ISBN 0-471-05225-6.
- May, Arthur J. (1963). The Age of Metternich 1814–1848.
- Musulin, Stella (1975). Vienna in the Age of Metternich. London: Faber and Faber. ISBN 0-571-09858-4.
- Nadeau, Ryan M. (2016). "Creating a Statesman: The Early Life of Prince Clemens von Metternich and its Effect on his Political Philosophy". The Gettysburg Historical Journal. 15. ISSN 2327-3917. OCLC 830314384.
- Okey, Robin (2001). The Habsburg Monarchy, c. 1765–1918. Macmillan. ISBN 978-0-333-39654-4.
- Palmer, Alan (1972). Metternich: Councillor of Europe (1997 reprint ed.). London: Orion. ISBN 978-1-85799-868-9.
- Phillips, Walter Alison (1911). "Metternich-Winneburg, Clemens Wenzel Lothar" . In Chisholm, Hugh (ed.). Encyclopædia Britannica. Vol. 18 (11th ed.). Cambridge University Press. pp. 301–307.
- Riley, J. P. (2013). Napoleon and the World War of 1813: Lessons in Coalition Warfighting. Routledge.
- Ross, Stephen T. (1969). European Diplomatic History 1789–1815: France against Europe.
- Seward, Desmond (1991). Metternich: The First European. London: Viking. ISBN 978-0-670-82600-1.
- Sked, Alan (1983). "Metternich". History Today. 33 (6).
- Sked, Alan (2008). Metternich and Austria: An Evaluation. Basingstoke, England: Palgrave Macmillan. ISBN 978-1-4039-9114-0.

=== Primary sources ===
- Walker, Mack, ed. Metternich's Europe: Selected Documents (1968) 352 pp. of primary sources in English translation.
