= Sándor-Metternich mansion =

Coordinates: 47.6527°N 18.6021°E

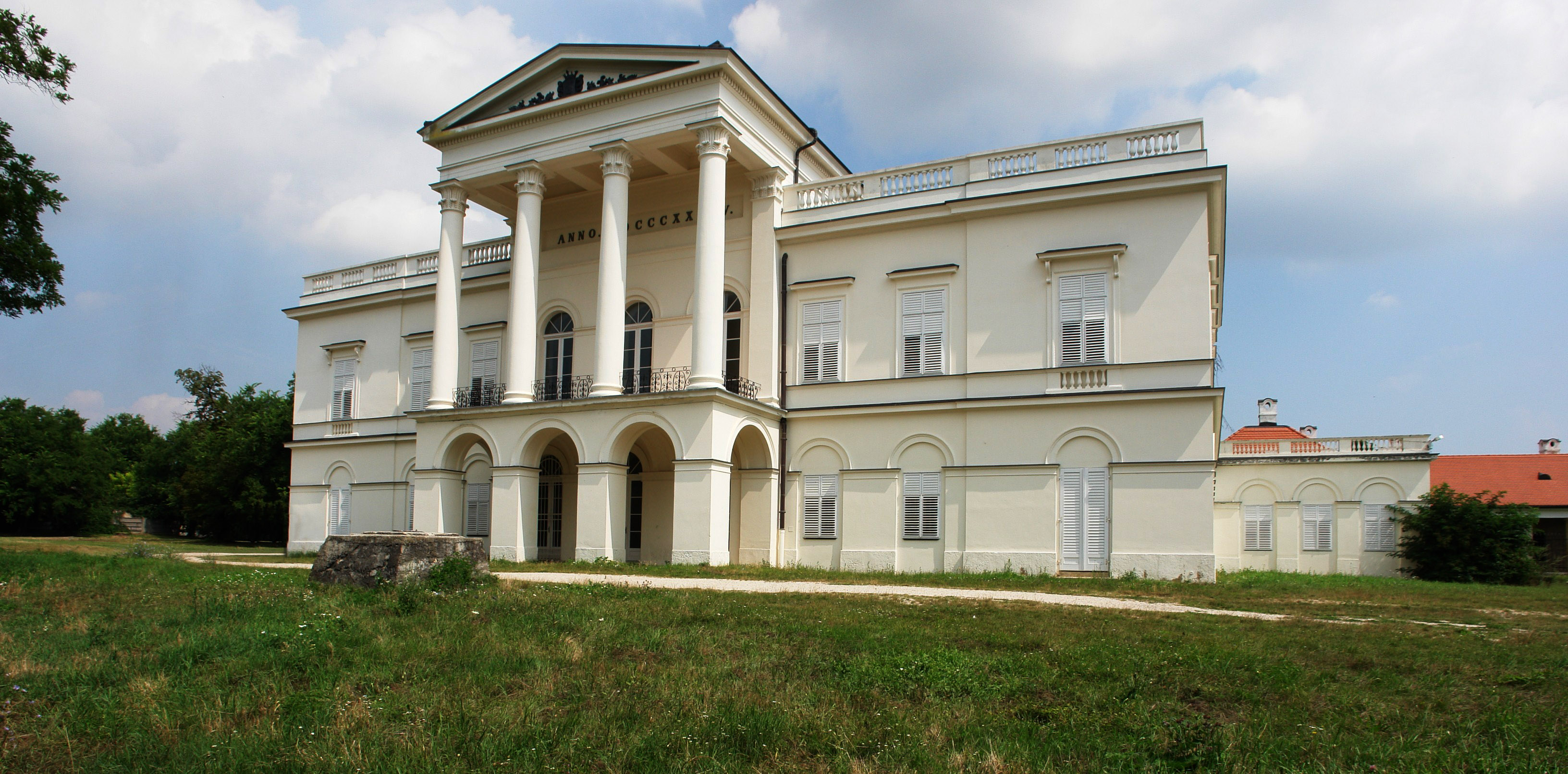
The Sándor-Metternich mansion in Bajna

The Sándor-Metternich mansion (Hungarian: Sándor–Metternich-kastély) is a classicist manor in Bajna in Esztergom County, Hungary. It lies approximately 50 kilometres northwest of Budapest. It was the main country residence of the Metternich-Sándor family. It has been restored from ruins with the help of the European Union and is open for visitors.

== History ==
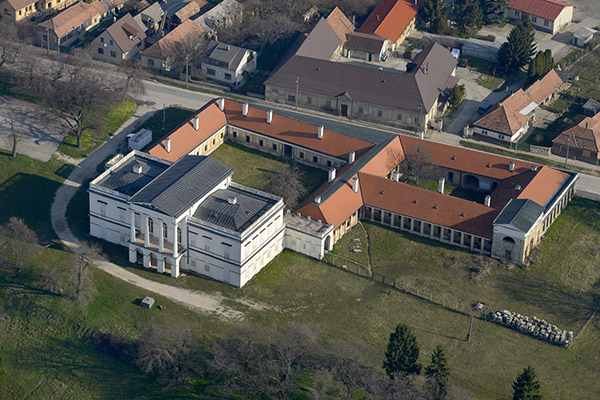
The Sándor-Metternich mansion from the air

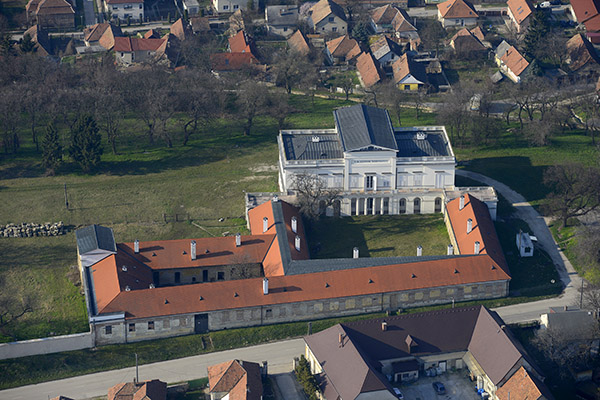
The Sándor-Metternich mansion from the air

=== Sándor family ===
Already at the end of the 15 century, a noble manor house existed on the site of the current mansion. It was acquired by the Sándor family in 1696, and they made it the center of their estates. The family belonged to the Hungarian nobility and held important positions. Their main residence at the time was in the city of Esztergom. Count Menyhért Sándor (1661-1723), deputy-lieutenant of the Esztergom county, erected a hunting lodge on the site of the current mansion and surrounded it by a game garden. Count Antal Sándor (1734-1788) replaced the lodge with a manor house, which was completed in 1776 when archbishop József Batthyány consecrated the mansion's chapel.

=== Móric Sándor ===
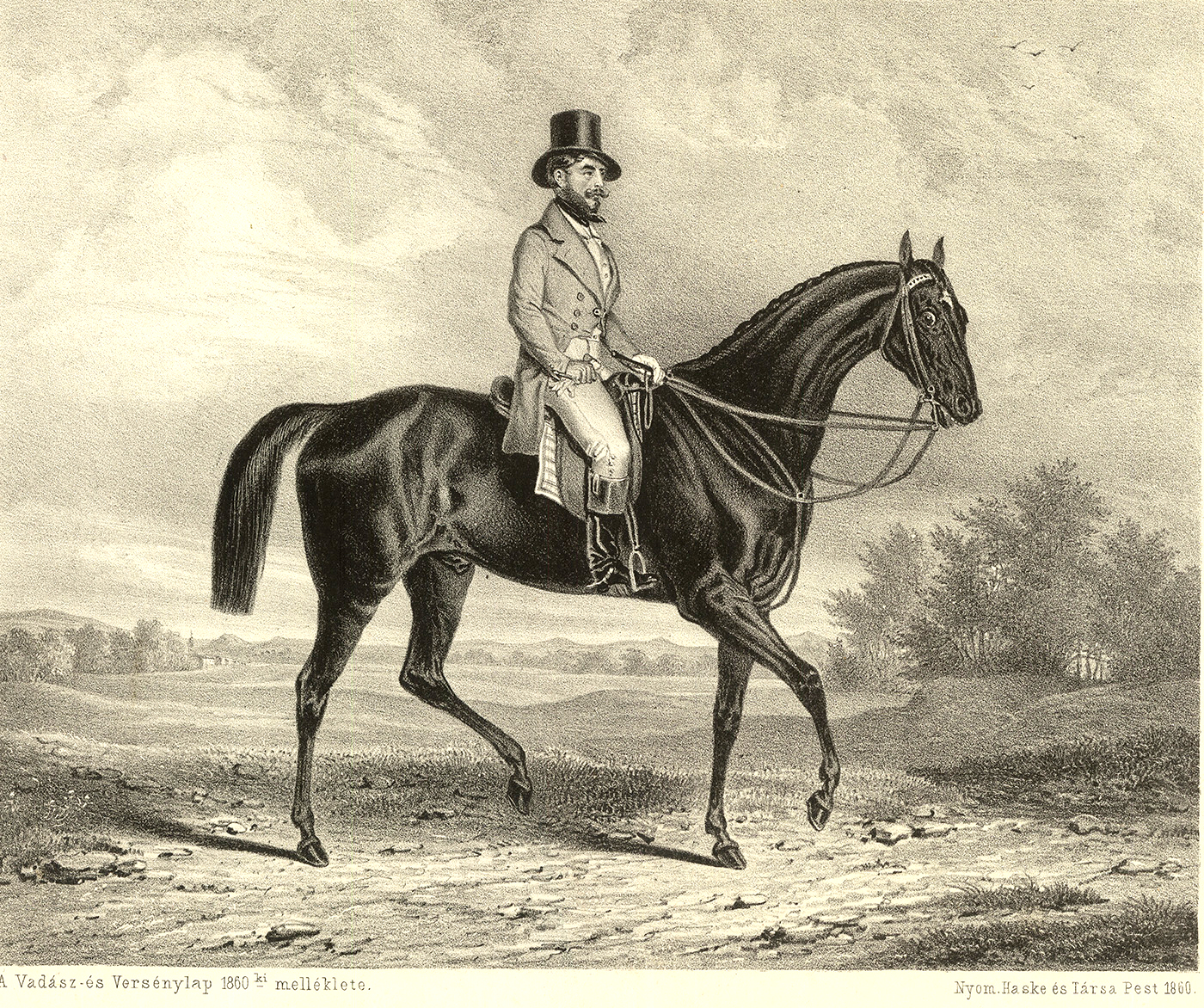
Count Móric Sándor

Count Móric Sándor was famous for his horsemanship throughout Europe. He earned himself the nickname the Devil's Horseman. In February 1835, he married the daughter of the Austrian chancellor Klemens von Metternich, princess Leontine von Metternich (1811 - 1861). As he wanted to present her with a mansion worthy to her status, he started to transform the manor house into a fifty-nine room palace a year before the marriage (1834). He entrusted one of the most famous architects of his time, József Hild, to help. He created the two-storey building with a portico with four columns. Legend tells that count Móric Sándor jumped from the balcony with his horse as a bet.

The ground level of the mansion contained a billiard room, a dining room, a smoking room, a conservatory, a house chapel and the card room. The bedrooms of the count and countess, the living room and the library were located on the first floor. Alessandro Sanquirico, an Italian architect from Milan, was engaged in the design of the interior. The dominating colors were sky blue and white. Sanqurico was inspired by Etruscan and Pompeian art, as well as Raphael. In addition to inlaid stucco created by Maria Piazza, the walls were decorated with paintings of Sándor familu members, antlers, hunting trophies and gilded mirrors. The furniture was created in London, while Viennese masters created the wrought iron elements. The game park was changed into a thirty-acre English landscape garden including a palmhouse. Also, there were the stables where the count kept his beloved world-famous horses.

=== Metternich-Sándor ===
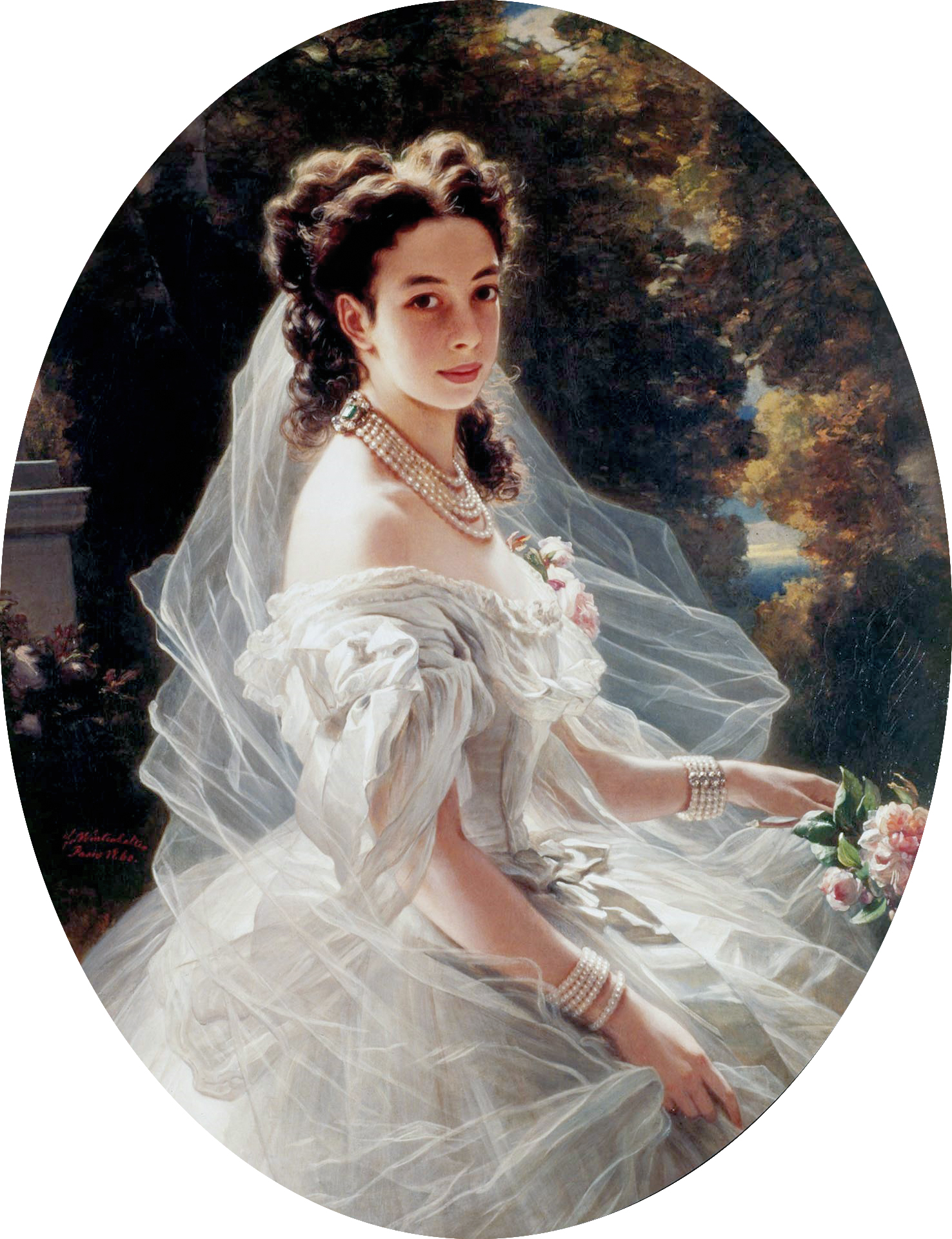
Pauline Metternich-Sándor by Franz Xaver Winterhalter

After the death of Móric Sándor, as there was no male heir, his daughter Paulina Sándor (1836-1921) inherited the estate. She married her uncle Richard von Metternich and they merged their surnames to 'Metternich-Sándor'. They modernized the kitchens and introduced gas lightning. The last owner of the family was their youngest daughter, princess Clementine von Metternich-Sandor (1870–1963). As she was badly injured by her dog as a child, she decided never to marry due to her scarred face. As her heir, she adopted her grand nephew, duke Franz-Albrecht von Hohenlohe-Waldenburg-Schillingsfürst (1920-2009), the son of Victor III, Duke of Ratibor and Prince of Corvey (a branch of the princely house of Hohenlohe). He changed his surname to Metternich-Sándor, and lived in Bajna up to 1940, where he attended primary school and served in the Hungarian army. Due to the troubles after the Second World War, princess Clementine had to abandon the Bajna mansion and its estateds, and she left Hungary in 1947. She spent her last years on Schloss Corvey, one of the residences Franz-Albrecht inherited when he became duke of Ratibor.

=== Communist times ===
The Second World War brought the destruction of the castle in all its glory. First, it became a field hospital and emergency housing. Then in communist times, it became public property and was used a local cooperative. Interior walls were smashed, murals were destroyed, and the furniture was stolen. In the 1970s, there were plans to turn the mansion into a guest house. Also the Indiana University Bloomington considered to use it, but finally backed out. As nothing materialized, the palace stood empty for years, deprived of all its splendor, it began to decline and the gardens and the park overgrown.

=== Renovation ===
With help of funding by the European Union and as part of the 'Nemzeti Kastélyprogram és Nemzeti Várprogram' (Hungarian national program for castles, palaces and mansions), renovation of both the mansion and garden started in March 2018. It received an ICOMOS price for the restoration in 2021. It has been opened for visitors with an interactive exhibition focused on count Móric Sándor and his daughter Pauline von Metternich.

== Literature ==
- Alice D Mezey; Ilona Schönenë Pusztai (1993). "A bajnai Sándor-Metternich kastély". In Ilona Valter (ed.). Entz Géza nyolcvanadik születésnapjára (in Hungarian). Budapest: Országos Műemlékvédelmi Hiv. pp. 179–190. ISBN 963-7143-27-0.
- Benkhard, Lilla (2008). "A Bajnai Both család udvarháza. Régészeti kutatások a bajnai Sándor-Metternich-kastélyban, 1995–2004". In István Feld, Selysette Somorjai (ed.). Kastélyok évszázadai, évszázadok kastélyai (PDF) (in Hungarian). Budapest: Castrum Bene Egyesület. pp. 55–74. ISBN 978-9638725974.
- Alice D Mezey (2008). "„Castellum" Bajna. A bajnai kastély a 18. században". In István Feld, Selysette Somorjai (ed.). Kastélyok évszázadai, évszázadok kastélyai (PDF) (in Hungarian). Budapest: Castrum Bene Egyesület. pp. 217–232. ISBN 978-9638725974.
- Alice D Mezey (2008). "Hild József szerepe a Sándor-család bajnai kastélya és gyarmatpusztai vadászkastélya építéstörténetében". In Maróczy Katalin (ed.). Hild József építészete (in Hungarian). Budapest: TERC Kft. pp. 130–144. ISBN 978-9639535701.
