= House of Metternich =

Austrian noble family

Coat of arms of the Princes of Metternich-Winneburg

The House of Metternich was an old German noble family originating in the Rhineland. The most prominent member was Prince Klemens von Metternich, who was the dominant figure at the Congress of Vienna (1814–1815). As a former reigning house (mediatised), the Metternich family belonged to the small circle of high nobility.

== History ==
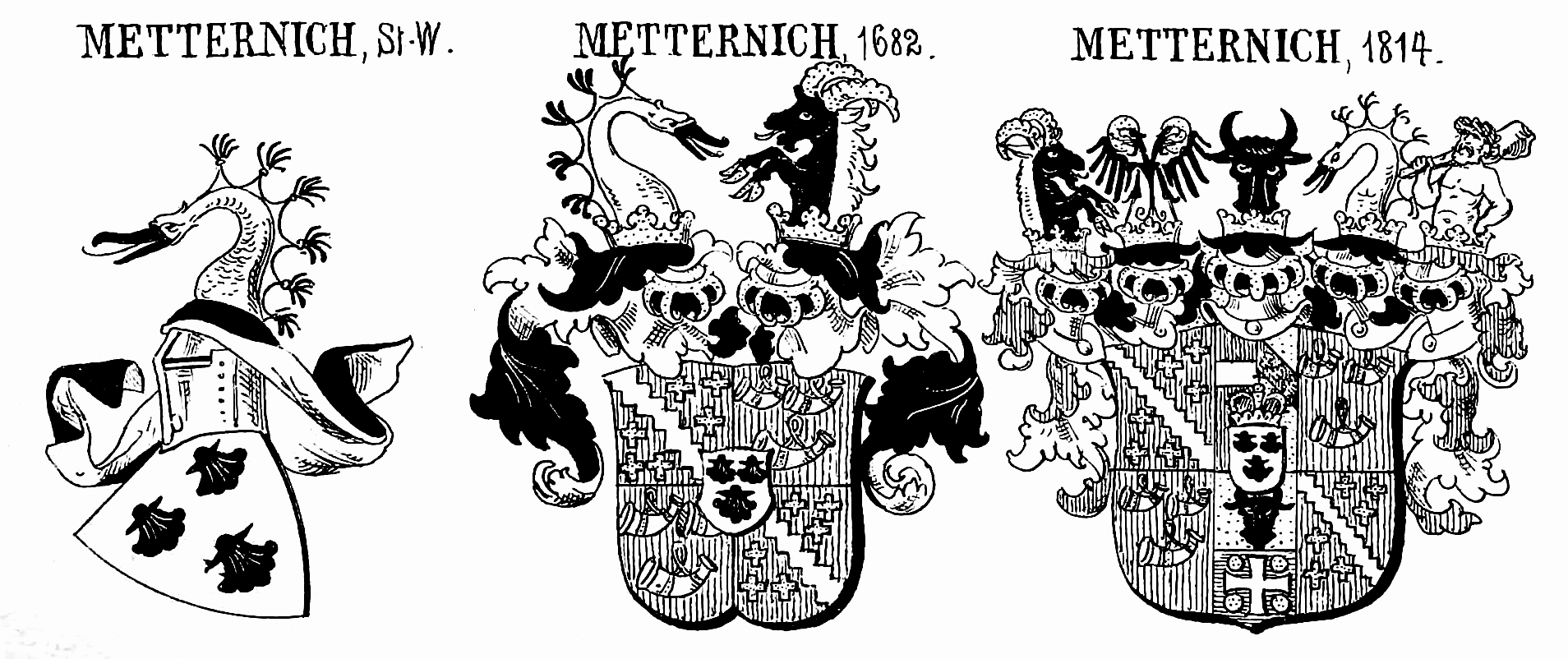
Evolution of the Metternich arms

The family originated as a cadet branch of the lords of Hemmerich (which today is a district of Bornheim, near Bonn). The head of the family rose to the position of hereditary chamberlain of the Elector of Cologne. This branch of the family drew its name from the village of Metternich in Weilerswist, beginning in the 13th century.

By the 16th century, the family had seven distinct branches:

- Metternich-Burscheid in the Duchy of Luxembourg
- Metternich-Winneburg in the Electorate of Trier
- Metternich-Chursdorf in the Margraviate of Brandenburg
- Metternich-Rodendorf in the Duchy of Lorraine
- Metternich-Müllenark in the Duchy of Jülich
- Metternich-Brohl-Heddesdorf in the Duchy of Jülich

== Metternich-Burscheid ==
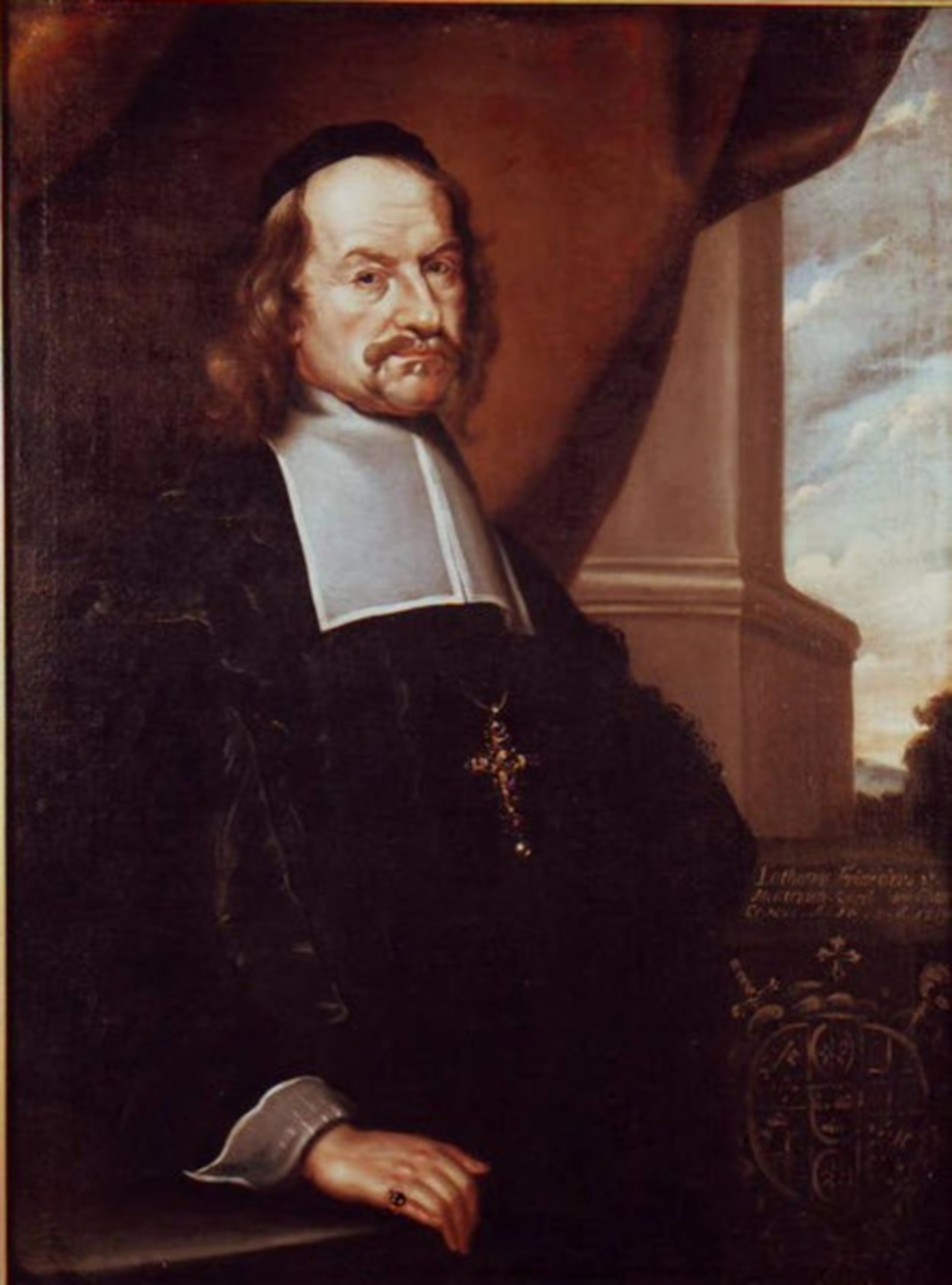
Lothar Friedrich von Metternich-Burscheid (1617–1675), Elector of Mainz

Dieter von Metternich acquired Zievel by marriage in 1494, and came to be ruler of Burscheid. His son, also named Dieter von Metternich (died 1600) styled himself Lord of Mersch and Esch-sur-Sûre. His grandson, Wolfgang Heinrich von Metternich (died 1699) acquired Dodenburg, Neckar, Steinbach, and Densborn. Wolfgang Heinrich von Metternich's brother Lothar Friedrich von Metternich-Burscheid was Elector of Mainz.

== Metternich-Chursdorf ==
A second line of the family, founded by Johann Reinhard Freiherr von Metternich, came to rule Chursdorf. This branch of the family converted to the Protestant faith. Johann Reinhard Freiherr von Metternich's son Ernst von Metternich, made a Graf in 1697, was a soldier in the service of Frederick I of Prussia and a member of the privy council of Brandenburg-Prussia. Ernst von Metternich was involved in the diplomacy that saw Frederick I granted the title King in Prussia, in Prussia's acquisition of Neuchâtel, and in the negotiating of the Treaty of Utrecht in 1713. Ernst von Metternich's brother was a member of the privy council of the Principality of Ansbach and in 1726 became Chancellor of Schwarzburg. He was also an author on questions of theosophy and alchemy.

== Metternich-Winneburg-Beilstein ==
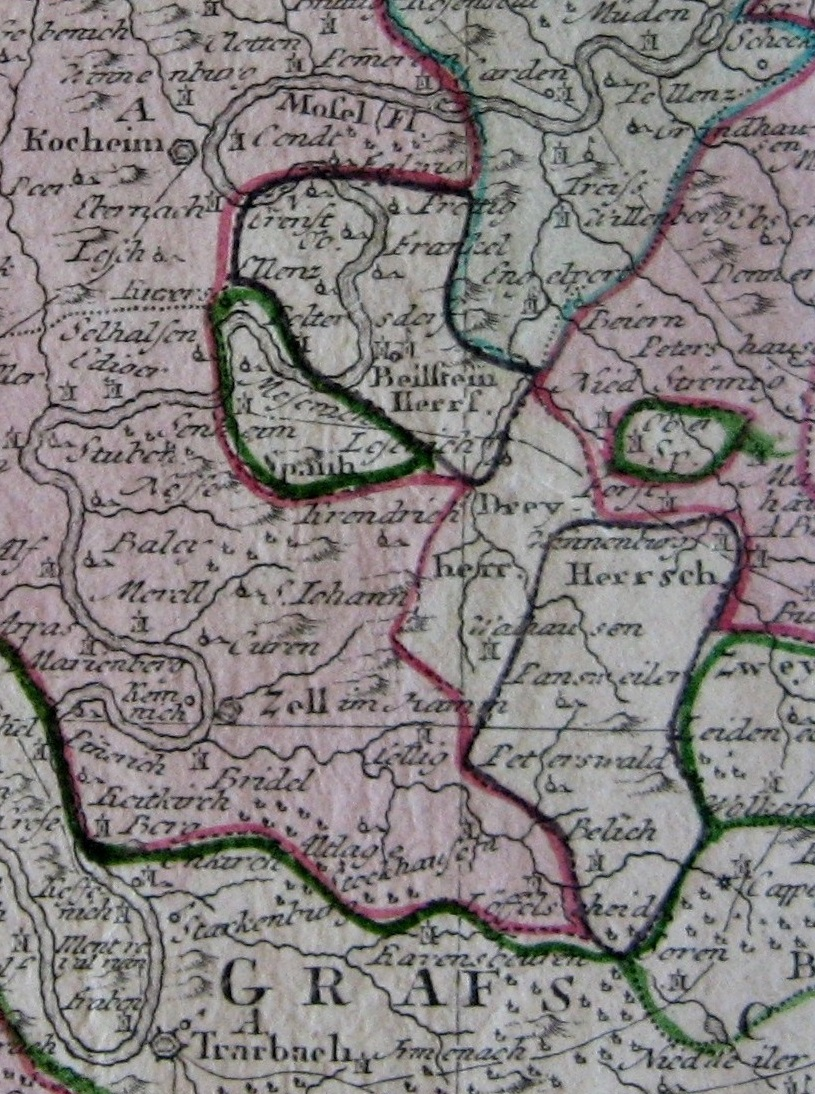
The Lordship of Winneburg–Beilstein in the Moselle Valley

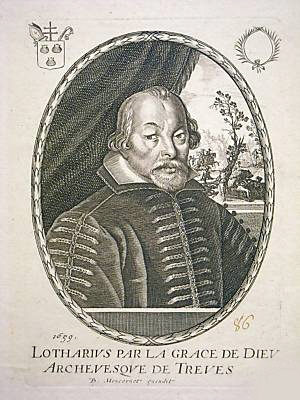
Lothar von Metternich (1551–1623), Elector of Trier

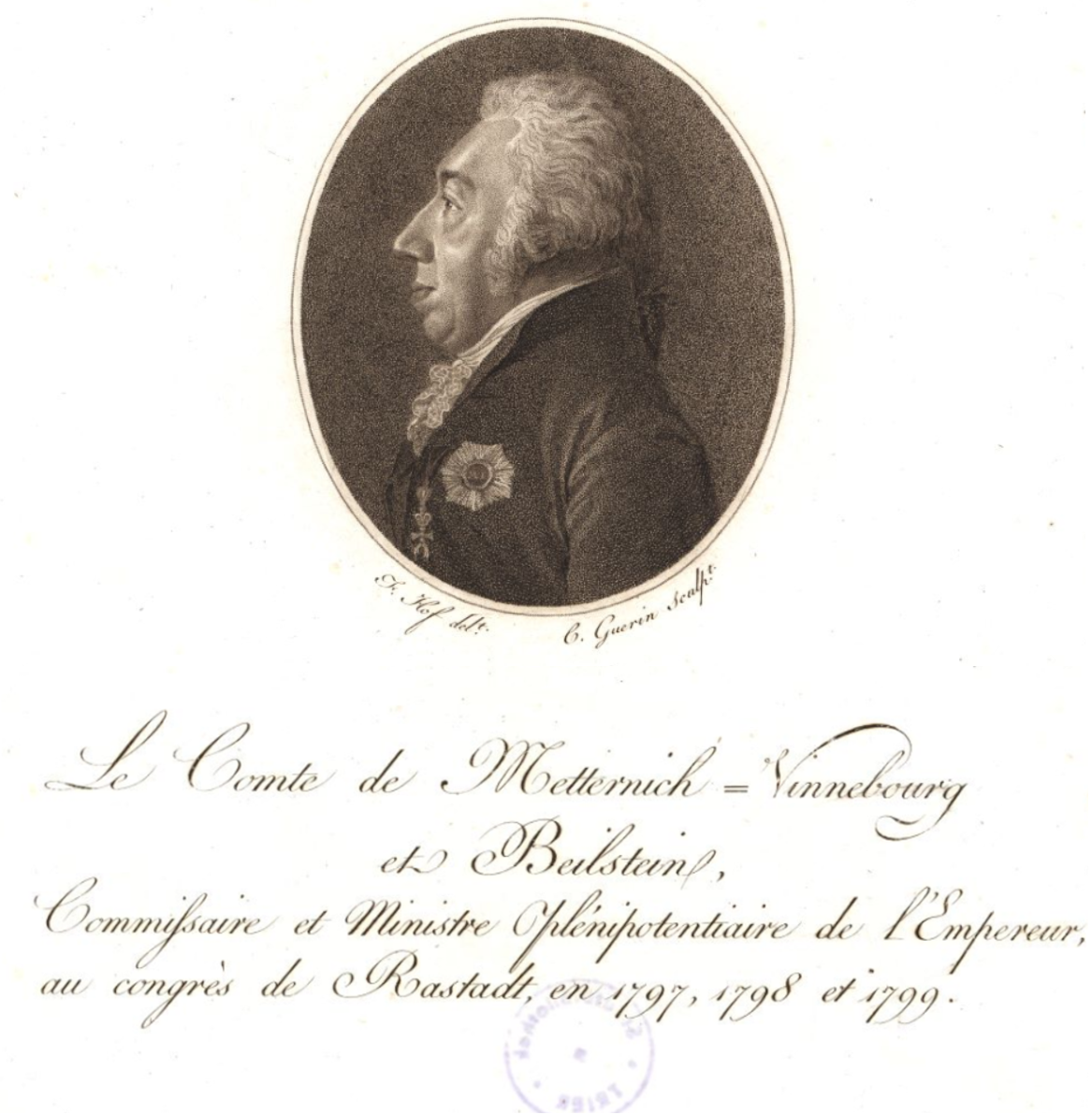
Franz Georg Karl Fürst von Metternich-Winneburg-Beilstein (1746–1818)

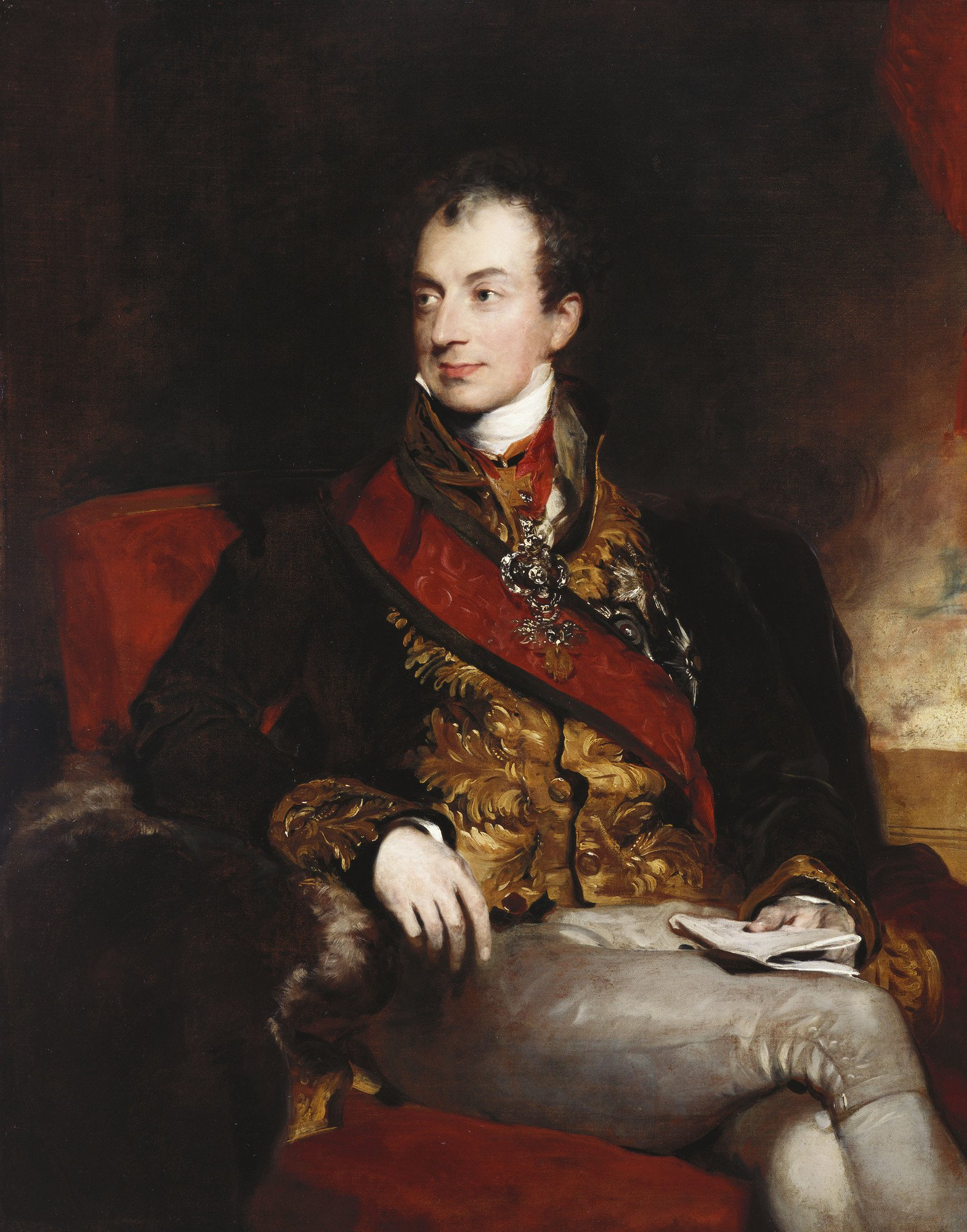
Klemens von Metternich (1773–1859)

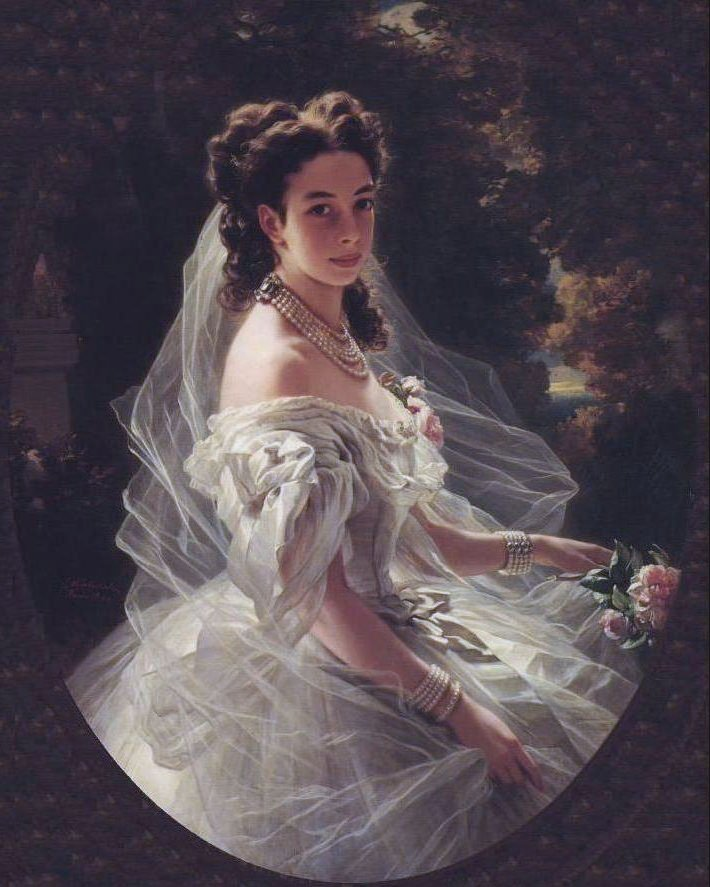
Princess Pauline von Metternich (1836–1921)

In 1635, the family of the Elector of Trier, Lothar Johann Reinhard von Metternich (1551–1623), acquired the immediate Lordship of Beilstein, which made them free from any other overlord than the emperor, and began styling themselves as Freiherren von Metternich-Winneburg zu Beilstein. Their title was upgraded to Graf in 1679. Lothar Johann Reinhard von Metternich's nephews, Karl von Metternich and Emmerich von Metternich, were opposed to the policies of the Elector of Trier Philipp Christoph von Sötern.

In 1623–30, the Imperial Quartermaster General, Lothar von Metternich, and his brother Wilhelm purchased the lordships of Lázně Kynžvart and the village of Metternich near Koblenz. Wilhelm's eldest son, Karl Heinrich von Metternich-Winneburg, was Elector of Mainz and Prince-Bishop of Worms in 1679. The younger son, Philip Emmerich von Metternich (d. 1698), was raised to the rank of Graf.

The last Count of Metternich-Winneburg was Franz Georg Karl von Metternich-Winneburg-Beilstein (1746–1818), who lost the ancestral lordship to France by the 1801 Treaty of Lunéville. In compensation, Francis II, Holy Roman Emperor, gave him the secularized Ochsenhausen Abbey and raised him to the rank of Fürst in 1803. Their immediate territories were mediatized by the Kingdom of Württemberg in 1806. His daughter Princess Pauline Kunigunde married Duke Ferdinand Frederick Augustus of Württemberg (brother of Frederick I, King of Württemberg, brother-in-law of Francis II, Holy Roman Emperor and uncle of Alexander I, Emperor of Russia).

His son, Klemens von Metternich, worked in the service of the Austrian Empire; he was a major diplomat at the Congress of Vienna and was Minister-President of Austria from 1821 to 1848. He acquired Schloss Johannisberg in the Rheingau. Klemens' eldest surviving son, Richard von Metternich, was a diplomat and married his half-niece, Pauline Sándor de Szlavnicza (she was the daughter of Richard's half-sister, Eleonore).

Richard and Pauline von Metternich had three daughters, but no sons, so upon the death of Richard, the title of Fürst passed to Richard's half-brother, Paul von Metternich (1834–1906). The title then passed to his son, Klemens Wenzel von Metternich (1869–1930). His son, Paul Alfons von Metternich-Winneburg (1917–1992), was the president of ADAC. He was the last male Metternich, and the title of Fürst became extinct with his death. The situation had forced him to sell his family estate Schloss Johannisberg, with its famous winery, to the Oetker family in 1974.

The family name however passed to Franz Albrecht von Metternich-Sándor (1920–2009), whose mother was a descendant of Klemens von Metternich and who had been adopted by his aunt, Clementine von Metternich-Sándor (1870–1963). Franz Albrecht Metternich-Sándor, the son of Victor III, Duke of Ratibor and Prince of Corvey (a branch of the Princely House of Hohenlohe) inherited his father's titles. Franz Albrecht's eldest son is Viktor Metternich-Sándor (born 1964), who has headed the ducal House of Ratibor and Corvey since his father's death.

== Elevations of rank ==
Elevations of rank
Rank	Grantee	Granted on (date)
Freiherr	Wolfgang Heinrich von Metternich	April 14, 1664
Graf	Philipp Emmerich Freiherr von Metternich-Winneburg	March 20, 1667
Graf	Ernst Freiherr von Metternich-Chursdorf	May 28, 1696
Fürst	Franz Georg Carl Joseph Johann Nepomuk von Metternich-Winneburg	June 30, 1803
Extension of Austrian hereditary princedom	Descendants of Franz Georg Carl Joseph Johann Nepomuk von Metternich-Winneburg	October 20, 1813
Duke in the Kingdom of Naples	Klemens von Metternich	August 1, 1818

== Prominent members of the House of Metternich ==
- Lothar Johann Reinhard von Metternich (1551–1623), Archbishop-Elector of Trier
- Johann Reinhard Freiherr von Metternich, Protestant estate administrator, Halberstadt.
- Johann Burchard von Metternich († 1637), canon of Trier, Bamberg and Münster, provost of Mainz, Magdeburg and administrator of Halberstadt and provost of St. Bartholomew in Frankfurt am Main
- Karl von Metternich († 1635), canon of Trier, Liège, Eichstätt and Augsburg, archdeacon of St Castor, Karden and provost of Aachen Cathedral
- Emmerich von Metternich († 1653), canon in Trier, Worms, and Paderborn and provost in Trier
- Lothar von Metternich († 1663), Imperial Chamberlain, Privy Councillor, Colonel and Quartermaster General
- Wilhelm von Metternich († 1652), of imperial court and Council of war
- Heinrich von Metternich zu Brohl († 1654), first minister later soldier, governor of the occupied lower Palatinate of Bavaria and Major General
- Lothar Friedrich von Metternich-Burscheid (1617–1675), Archbishop-Elector of Mainz
- Karl Heinrich von Metternich-Winneburg (1622–1679), Archbishop-Elector of Mainz
- Ernst von Metternich (1656–1727), Prussian diplomat
- Wolfgang von Metternich († 1731), diplomat, civil servant and alchemical writer
- Franz Georg Karl von Metternich (1746–1818), politician
- Klemens von Metternich (1773–1859), Austrian diplomat and politician
- Princess Klementine von Metternich (1804–1820)
- Richard von Metternich (1829–1895), Austrian politician and diplomat
- Princess Pauline von Metternich (1836–1921), founder of a literary salon in Vienna
- Clementine von Metternich-Sandor (1870–1963)
- Tatiana von Metternich-Winneburg (1915–2006), philanthropist and patron of the arts
- Paul Alfons von Metternich-Winneburg (1917–1992), president of Fédération Internationale de l'Automobile (1975–1985)
