= Lordship of Winneburg and Beilstein =

German polity

Lordship of Winneburg and Beilstein Herrschaft Winneburg und Beilstein
- 1488–1801
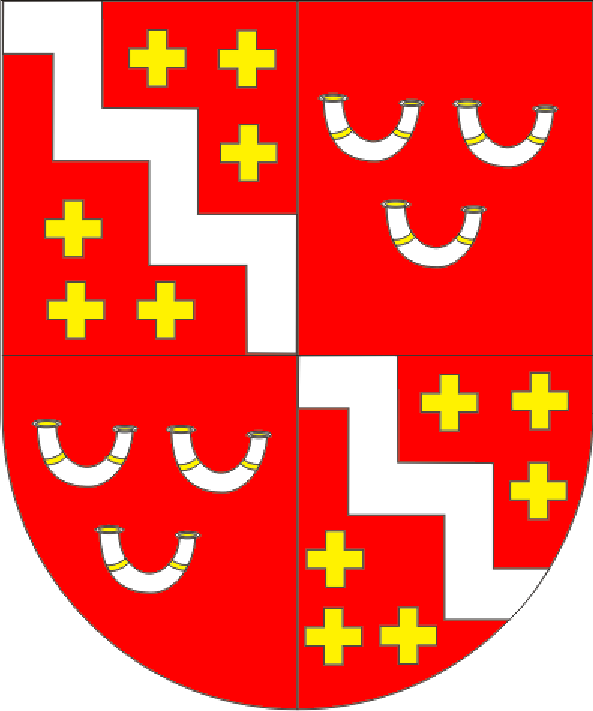
- Coat of arms
- Status: State of the Holy Roman Empire
- Capital: Beilstein
- Common languages: Moselle Franconian
- Government: Feudal Lordship
  - from 1652: House of Metternich
- Historical era: Middle Ages
  - Lordship founded: 13th century
  - Fiefdom of Trier: 1488
  - Ceded to France: 1801
  - Acquired by Prussia: 1815
Preceded by	Succeeded by
Duchy of Lorraine	Kingdom of Prussia

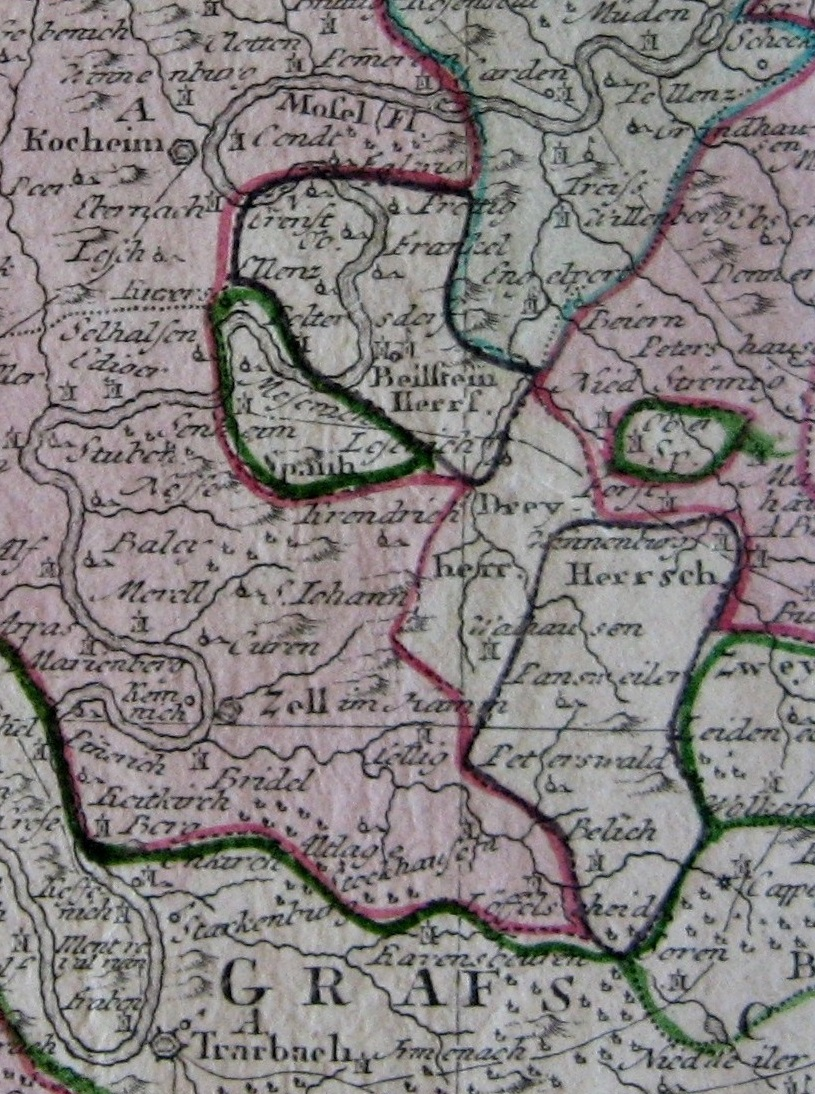
The Lordship of Beilstein in the Moselle Valley

The Lordship of Winneburg and Beilstein (German: Herrschaft Winneburg und Beilstein) was a territory of the Holy Roman Empire made of non-contiguous parts located in the Moselle Valley around Winneburg Castle near Cochem, and Beilstein, on the Moselle River. It should not be confused with the County of Beilstein, or Nassau-Beilstein, which belonged to the House of Nassau.

== History ==
The Lords of Winneburg were first mentioned in a 1304 deed, they also acquired the estates of the neighbouring Beilstein Castle in 1362. In the following decades the Lords of Winneburg and Beilstein were forced to give their lands in pawn to the Archbishops of Trier, who after a feud, finally seized the property in 1488, only to lend it back as a fiefdom a few years later.

After the Winneburg-Beilstein line had become extinct in 1637, the Lordships of Winneburg and Beilstein returned to the descendants of the Trier archbishop Lothar von Metternich (1551–1623). From 1637 on called themselves Freiherren von Metternich-Winneburg zu Beilstein and were elevated to Imperial counts in 1679. In 1652, the Archbishop of Trier, gave the Lordships of Winneburg and Beilstein in fief to the Vettelhoven branch of House of Metternich. The last reigning Count Franz George Karl lost his territory to France in 1794, with the country officially annexing the left bank of the Rhine following the 1801 Treaty of Lunéville. He was however compensated in the course of the German mediatization with the possession of secularized Ochsenhausen Abbey and with the title of Prince of the Holy Roman Empire in 1803.

According to the Final Act of the Congress of Vienna, Winneburg-Beilstein together with the Rhineland fell to Prussia in 1815. Franz George Karl's son, Prince Klemens Wenzel von Metternich took the chance to buy the ruin of Winneburg Castle in 1832 but never rebuilt it.
