= Clementine von Metternich-Sandor =

Austrian princess (1870–1963)

Princess Clementine von Metternich-Sándor
- Full name: Clementine Marie Melanie Sofie Leontine Crescentia
- Born: 27 June 1870; Paris, France
- Died: 25 October 1963 (aged 93); Schloss Corvey; North Rhine-Westphalia; West Germany
- Noble family: Metternich
- Father: Richard, 2nd Prince of Metternich-Winneburg zu Beilstein
- Mother: Countess Pauline Sándor de Szlavnicza

Princess Clementine von Metternich-Sándor Winneburg (27 June 1870 – 25 October 1963) was an Austrian aristocrat.

== Early life ==
She was born in Paris on 27 June 1870 into the House of Metternich. Her father was the Austrian diplomat Richard, 2nd Prince of Metternich-Winneburg zu Beilstein. Her mother was Countess Pauline Sándor de Szlavnicza, an Austro-Hungarian socialite. Her mother was the daughter of her father's half-sister, Princess Leontine von Metternich-Winneburg. As a child she was badly injured after being attacked by a dog. She lived at Metternich Palace in Vienna.

== Adult life ==
Princess Clementine, a favorite of the Hungarian composer Franz Liszt and a close friend of the famous coloratura soprano Adelina Patti, was the founder of the Catholic charities organization in prewar Austria and devoted her life to charitable activities.

As an adult, she adopted her grand nephew, Prince Franz Albrecht von Hohenlohe-Waldenburg-Schillingsfürst, who was the son of her niece, Princess Elisabeth von Oettingen-Oettingen und Oettingen-Spielberg, and Victor III, Duke of Ratibor. She abandoned the family estate, the Sándor-Metternich mansion in Bajna, in Hungary in 1947 and spent her last years with Prince Franz.

Princess Clementine, who never married, died on 25 October 1963 at Schloss Corvey in Germany. Prior to her death, the Princess was the last surviving grandchild of Klemens, Prince of Metternich-Winneburg zu Beilstein, the Austrian statesman who organized the Congress of Vienna between November 1814 and June 1815.

== Ancestry ==
Ancestors of Clementine von Metternich-Sandor

8. Franz Georg Karl, Count of Metternich-Winneburg
4. Klemens, 1st Prince of Metternich-Winneburg zu Beilstein (=14)
9. Countess Maria Beatrix von Kageneck
2. Richard, 2nd Prince of Metternich-Winneburg zu Beilstein
10. Baron Franz Georg von Leykam
5. Baroness Maria Antoinette von Leykam
11. Lucia Antonia Caputo di Petrella
1. Princess Clementine von Metternich-Sándor Winneburg
12. Count Vincze Sándor de Szlavnicza
6. Count Móric Sándor de Szlavnicza
13. Countess Anna Maria Szapáry de Szapár muraszombati Szapáry
3. Countess Pauline Sándor de Szlavnicza
14. Klemens, 1st Prince of Metternich-Winneburg zu Beilstein (= 4)
7. Princess Leontine von Metternich-Winneburg
15. Countess Maria Eleonore Gräfin von Kaunitz-Rietberg
