= Dragensdorf =

- Ortsteil of Dittersdorf
- Interactive map of Dragensdorf
- Location within Germany Location within Thuringia
- Coordinates: 50°38′44″N 11°50′2″E
- Country: Germany
- State: Thuringia
- District: Saale-Orla-Kreis
- Municipality: Dittersdorf

Area
  - Total: 3.07 km^{2} (1.19 sq mi)
- Elevation: 455 m (1,493 ft)

Population (2009-12-31)
  - Total: 72
  - Density: 23/km^{2} (61/sq mi)
- Time zone: UTC+01:00 (CET)
  - Summer (DST): UTC+02:00 (CEST)
- Postal codes: 07907
- Dialling codes: 036648

Dragensdorf is a village and a former municipality in the district Saale-Orla-Kreis, in Thuringia, Germany. Since 1 December 2010, it is part of the municipality Dittersdorf.
