= Princess Klementine von Metternich =

Austrian princess

Klementine von Metternich
- Full name: Klementine Maria Octavia
- Born: 30 August 1804
- Died: 6 May 1820 (aged 15)
- Noble family: Metternich
- Father: Klemens, Prince of Metternich-Winneburg zu Beilstein
- Mother: Countess Eleonore von Kaunitz

Princess Klementine Maria Octavia von Metternich (30 August 1804 – 6 May 1820) was an Austrian princess.

== Biography ==
Princess Klementine von Metternich was born on 30 August 1804 into the House of Metternich. Her father was the Austrian diplomat Klemens, Prince of Metternich-Winneburg zu Beilstein. Her mother was Countess Eleonore von Kaunitz, a granddaughter of Wenzel Anton, Prince of Kaunitz-Rietberg. She was their fifth child and second daughter.

Klementine was painted by Moritz Michael Daffinger in 1819, posed as the goddess Hebe. The painting Portrait of a Lady attributed to Sir Thomas Lawrence is allegedly a portrait of Klementine.

She died from tuberculosis on 6 May 1820.
