= Hayl family of organ builders =

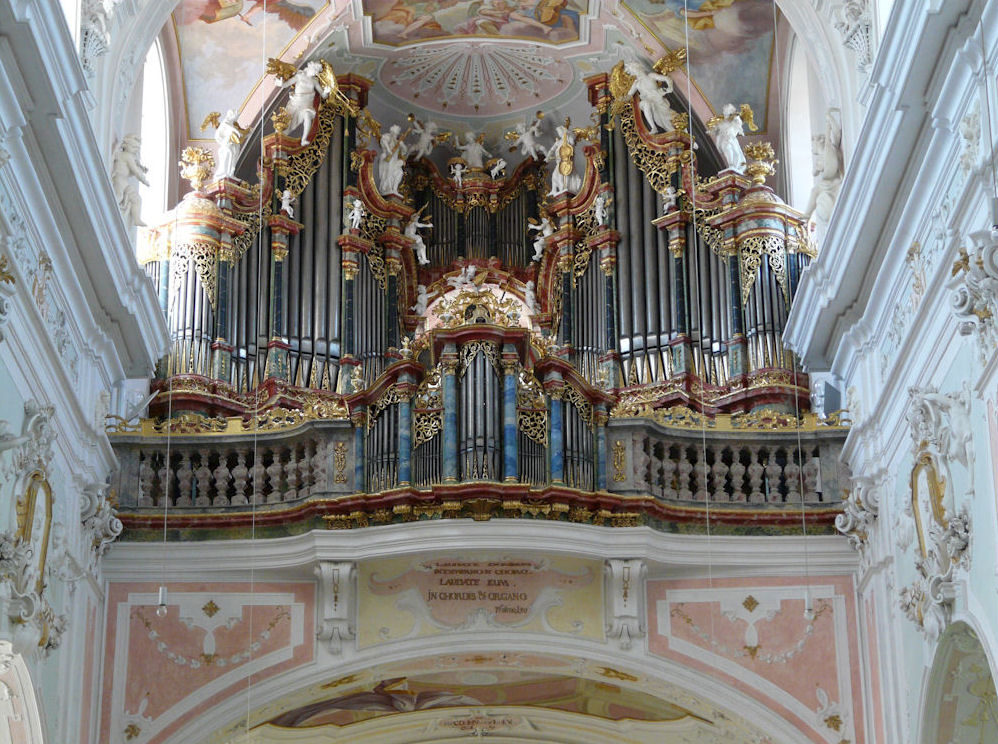
Organ at Ochsenhausen Abbey, built by Daniel Hayl the elder in the years 1599–1603.

The Hayl family (also spelled Hail) was a German family of organ builders active in Germany, Austria, and Italy from 1591 through 1642.

== History ==
The patriarch of the Hayl family was Daniel Hayl the elder (fl. 1591 – c. 1615) who built organs in Germany and Austria in variety locations, including Konstanz Minster (1591–1592), Rheinau Abbey (1592–1594), Ochsenhausen Abbey (1599–1603), Dreifaltigkeitskirche, Kaufbeuren (1604–5), the Cistercian monastery in Stams (1610–12), and Andechs Abbey (1615) among others.

Daniel Hayl the elder had three sons. His son Hans Diepold Hayl was the only one of the three who did not build organs of his own, although he did assist family members in the construction of organs of their design. Daniel Hayl the younger (fl. 1618 – c. 1638) was active as an organ builder in Salzburg, Austria from 1618 through 1638. His most impressive contribution was a very large and impressive organ at Saint Peter's Abbey, Salzburg which he built from 1618 through 1620.

Simon Hayl (fl. 1618 – c. 1642 resided in Polling, Weilheim-Schongau where he built four organs (including at Polling Abbey) from 1621 through 1628. He also built organs in Bolzano, Italy (1618), Wessobrunn Abbey (1624), and parish churches in Prien am Chiemsee (1634) and Lana, South Tyrol (1635–7). His last known work was a repair to the organ at St. Mang's Abbey, Füssen in 1642.
