= Franz Georg Karl von Metternich =

German diplomat (1746–1818)

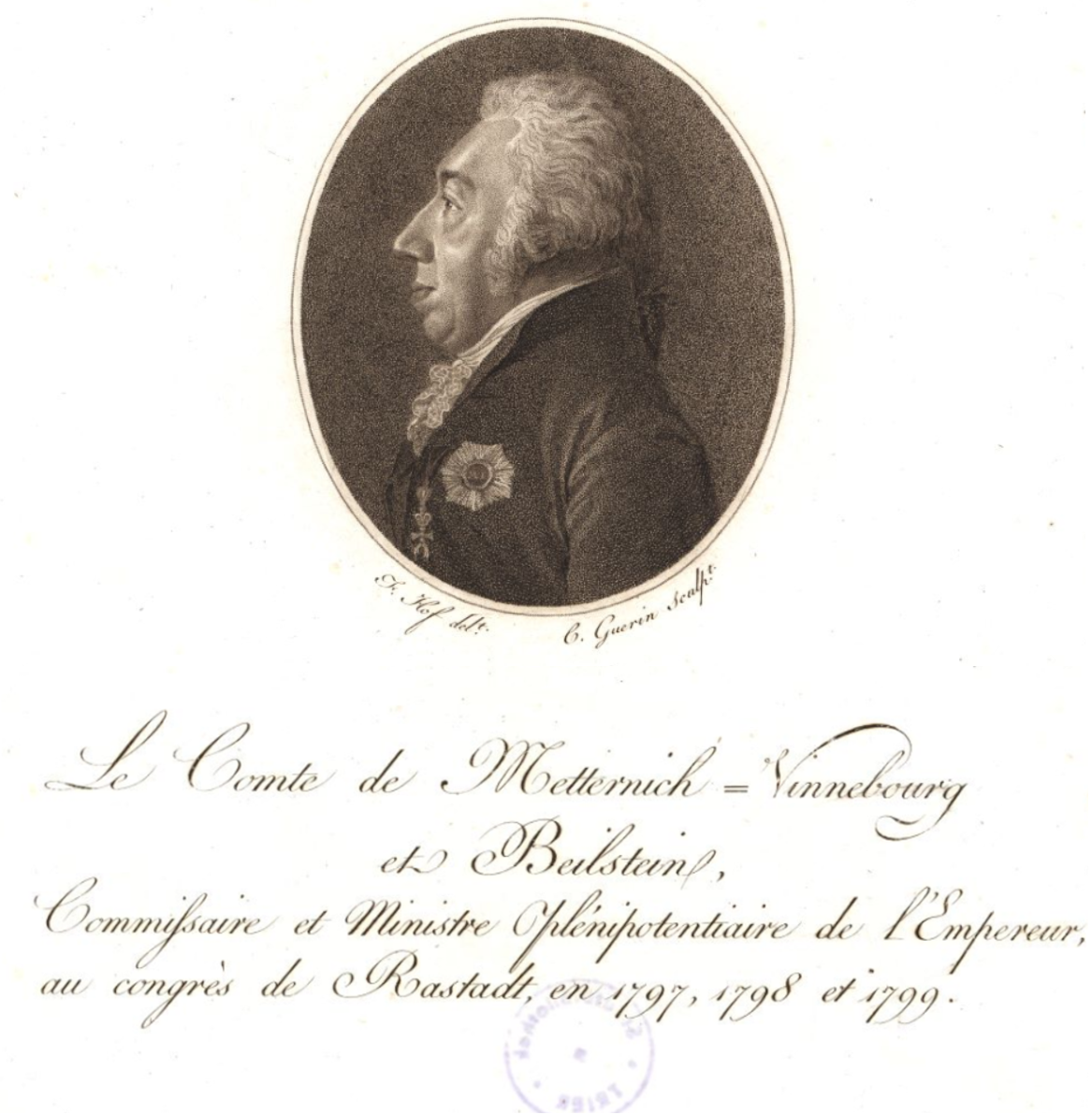
Portrait of Count von Metternich-Winneburg (1799)

Franz Georg Karl Count of Metternich-Winneburg, after 1803 Prince of Ochsenhausen (* 9 March 1746, Koblenz – 11 August 1818, Vienna) was a German diplomat and statesman in Austrian service.

== Family ==
He came from the Winneburg-Beilstein line of the noble Metternich family and was the son of Count Johann Hugo von Metternich-Winneburg and his wife Clara Luise, Baroness von Kesselstatt. He himself married Countess Maria Beatrix von Kageneck in 1771 and had multiple children. Among others, he was the father of Prince Klemens Wenzel Lothar von Metternich and father-in-law of Duke Ferdinand Frederick Augustus of Württemberg.

== Biography ==
=== Early life ===
As his father died at an early age, Metternich grew up under the guardianship of his uncle Franz Ludwig von Metternich-Winneburg. Metternich studied law in Mainz. He also learned about the functioning of the judiciary and administration in the Holy Roman Empire at the Imperial Chamber Court in Wetzlar, the Imperial Diet in Regensburg, and the Imperial Court Council in Vienna. Metternich then embarked on a Grand Tour through Italy.

After his return, Metternich became the envoy of the Elector of Trier, Clemens Wenzeslaus, in Vienna in 1768. He was later appointed State Councilor for Foreign Affairs by the Elector. Metternich advocated a policy that was favorable to France. Since he was unable to assert himself against the influential ministers, he moved to the imperial court in Vienna in 1773.

=== Imperial envoy ===
In Vienna, he was primarily supported by Wenzel Anton Kaunitz. He was appointed ambassador to the Electorates of Trier and Cologne, as well as to the Lower Rhine-Westphalian Imperial Circle. He played an important role in the election of Maria Kunigunde of Saxony as Princess-Abbess of Essen (1780) and in the election of Maximilian Franz of Austria as Archbishop of Cologne and Bishop of Münster. However, Metternich failed to get the imperial court's candidates elected in the bishoprics of Liège, Hildesheim, and Paderborn. Metternich was also ambassador to Mainz for a time, but lost the trust of Elector Friedrich Karl von Erthal due to intrigues and was recalled from this post. Metternich's attempt to obtain a position as chamber judge at the Imperial Chamber Court or even that of Imperial Vice-Chancellor. Instead, Metternich was appointed second electoral ambassador of Bohemia after the imperial election of Leopold II in 1790.

In 1782, he became a member of the Masonic Order in Strasbourg; the Karoline zu den drei Pfauen lodge in Neuwied listed him in its records in 1784 as Worshipful Master. He was also a member of the Illuminati.

=== Minister for the Austrian Netherlands ===
He later played a role in ending the Liège Revolution. Metternich was subsequently appointed Minister Plenipotentiary for the Austrian Netherlands. However, his sphere of influence was significantly restricted by the official governor, Duke Albert of Saxony-Teschen. His position in Brussels became dangerous in 1792 with the outbreak of the War of the First Coalition, and he withdrew temporarily. With the resignation of Kaunitz, Metternich lost his most important advocate in Vienna. After the loss of the Austrian Netherlands to France in 1794, Metternich returned to Vienna. The advance of the French caused him to lose most of his possessions in the Rhineland, plunging his family into financial difficulties. Initially without employment, he became imperial envoy to the Congress of Rastatt in 1797. After the outcome of the congress, which was rather negative for Austria (for which Metternich could not be blamed), he lost all support at the court in Vienna.

=== Later life ===
In 1803, the family was compensated for the loss of its possessions on the left bank of the Rhine under the Reichsdeputationshauptschluss with the Imperial Abbey of Ochsenhausen. Metternich bore the title of Prince of the Holy Roman Empire from then on. In addition, he was appointed Minister of State and Minister of Conferences in 1804, without any practical duties attached to the position. While his son Klemens was in Paris in 1810 for the wedding of Marie Louise of Austria to Napoleon, Metternich stood in for him as head of the court and state chancellery. In this role, he sought to bring Austria closer to Russia. Upon his return, Clemens reversed his father's orders, as he was at that time advocating a policy of alignment with France. As holder of the mediatized dominion of Ochsenhausen, Metternich was a member with full voting rights in the Württemberg assemblies of estates from 1815 to 1817, but did not attend the meetings in Stuttgart in person, instead sending Count Richard von Schaesberg-Thannheim as his representative. Metternich died in 1818.

== Literature ==
- Constantin von Wurzbach: "Metternich-Winneburg, Franz Georg Fürst." In: Biographisches Lexikon des Kaiserthums Oesterreich (Biographical Lexicon of the Empire of Austria). Part 18 Kaiserlich-königliche Hof- und Staatsdruckerei, Vienna 1868, p. 60–62 (digitalised).
- Helmut Mathy: Franz Georg von Metternich, der Vater des Staatskanzlers. Studien zur österreichischen Westpolitik am Ende des 18. Jahrhunderts (= Mainzer Abhandlungen zur mittleren und neueren Geschichte, Bd. 8). Hain, Meisenheim am Glan 1969.
- Karl Otmar Freiherr von Aretin (1994). "Franz Georg Graf von Metternich-Winneburg". Neue Deutsche Biographie (in German). Vol. 17. Berlin: Duncker & Humblot. pp. 235–236. (full text online).
