= Chursdorf =

- Ortsteil of Dittersdorf
- Interactive map of Chursdorf
- Location within Germany Location within Thuringia
- Coordinates: 50°40′N 11°50′E
- Country: Germany
- State: Thuringia
- District: Saale-Orla-Kreis
- Municipality: Dittersdorf

Area
  - Total: 6.17 km^{2} (2.38 sq mi)
- Elevation: 449 m (1,473 ft)

Population (2012-12-31)
  - Total: 181
  - Density: 29.3/km^{2} (76.0/sq mi)
- Time zone: UTC+01:00 (CET)
  - Summer (DST): UTC+02:00 (CEST)
- Postal codes: 07907
- Dialling codes: 036648
- Vehicle registration: SOK

Chursdorf is a village and a former municipality in the district Saale-Orla-Kreis, in Thuringia, Germany. Since 31 December 2013, it is part of the municipality Dittersdorf.
