= Richard von Metternich =

Austrian diplomat (1829–1895)

Richard
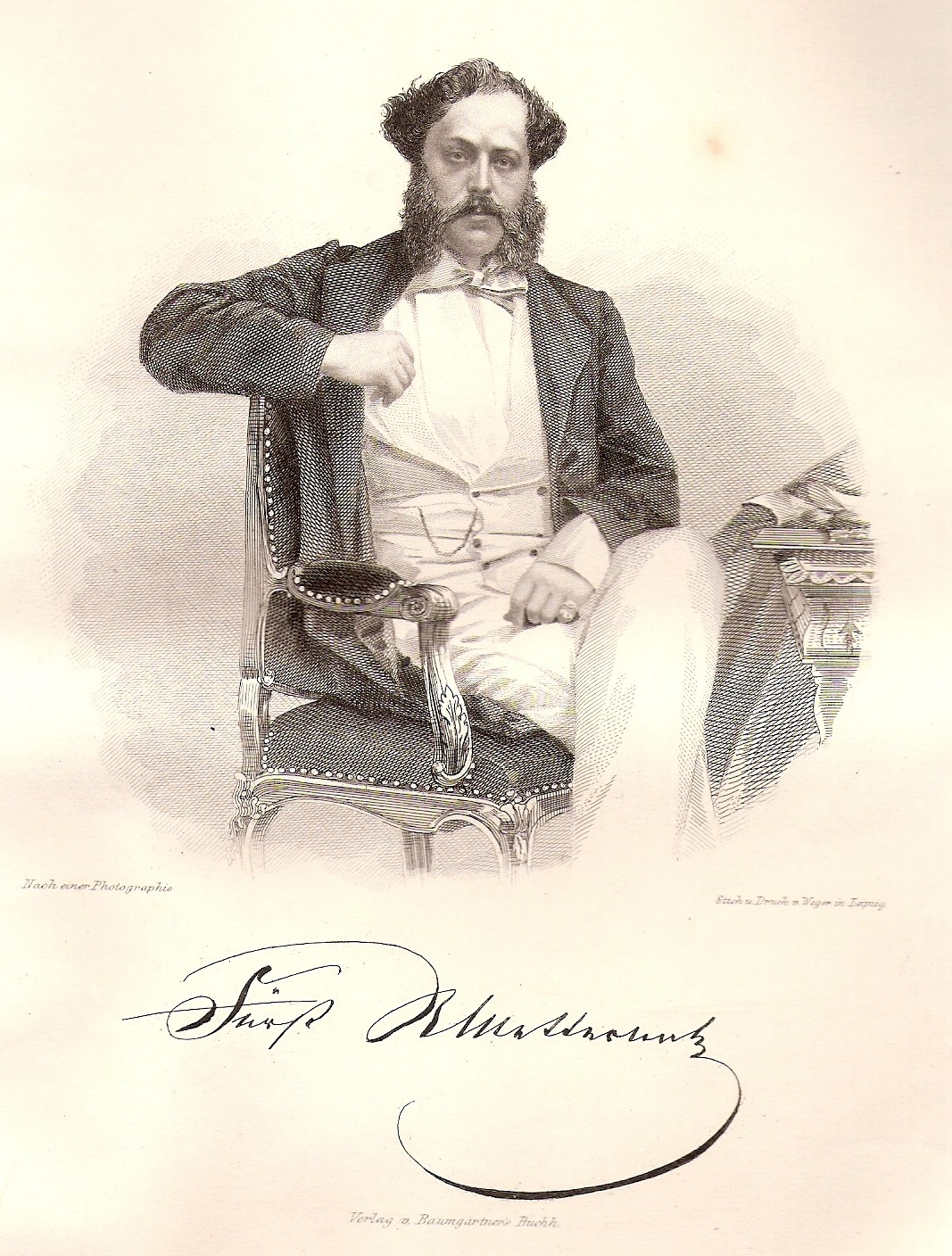

Prince of Metternich-Winneburg zu Beilstein
- Reign: 11 June 1859 - 1 March 1895
- Full name: Richard Klemens Josef Lothar Hermann
- Born: 7 January 1829
- Died: 1 March 1895 (aged 67)
- Noble family: Metternich
- Spouse: Countess Pauline Sándor de Szlavnicza
- Issue: Princess Sophie von Metternich-Sandor Winneburg; Princess Pascalina Antoinette von Metternich-Sandor Winneburg; Princess Klementina Marie von Metternich-Sandor Winneburg
- Father: Klemens, Prince of Metternich-Winneburg zu Beilstein
- Mother: Baroness Maria Antoinette von Leykam

Richard Klemens Josef Lothar Hermann, 2nd Prince of Metternich-Winneburg zu Beilstein (German: Richard Klemens, Fürst von Metternich-Winneburg zu Beilstein; 7 January 1829 – 1 March 1895), usually known as Richard von Metternich, was an Austrian diplomat and the eldest surviving son of the diplomat Klemens, Prince of Metternich-Winneburg zu Beilstein.

== Early life ==
Richard Metternich was born into the House of Metternich in Vienna on 7 January 1829. He was the eldest surviving son of Klemens von Metternich and his second wife, Baroness Maria Antonia von Leykam (15 August 1806 – 17 January 1829). His mother died 10 days after the birth of his son. His father, who was previously married to Countess Eleonore von Kaunitz, had served as Foreign Minister and Chancellor of the Austrian Empire.

His paternal grandparents were Franz George Karl Count Metternich-Winneburg zu Beilstein, a diplomat who served the Archbishopric of Trier before the Imperial court, and his wife Countess Maria Beatrix Aloisia von Kagenegg.

== Career ==
In 1855, Metternich followed his father into diplomacy, joining the Austrian Empire's embassy to the Second French Empire in Paris as a Legationssekretär (essentially a junior diplomat on a probation period). The next year, he was named Austria's Envoy Extraordinary and Minister Plenipotentiary to the Kingdom of Saxony and took up his post in Dresden.

In 1861, Emperor Franz Joseph I issued his February Patent and the follow-up October Diploma, thus creating the new Austrian Reichsrat. Metternich became an hereditary member of the Herrenhaus, the upper house of the new Reichsrat.

From 1859 to 1870, Metternich served as Ambassador of the Austrian Empire (after 1867, of Austria-Hungary) to the court of Napoleon III of France. During this period, his wife played a prominent role in Parisian society.

Metternich attempted to convince France to intervene on behalf of Austria during the Austro-Prussian War, but he was unsuccessful in this attempt. In 1857, while serving at the Imperial court, Metternich received the highest mark in the celebrated dictée de Mérimée.

In retirement, he edited and arranged for the publication of his father's memoirs.

== Personal life ==
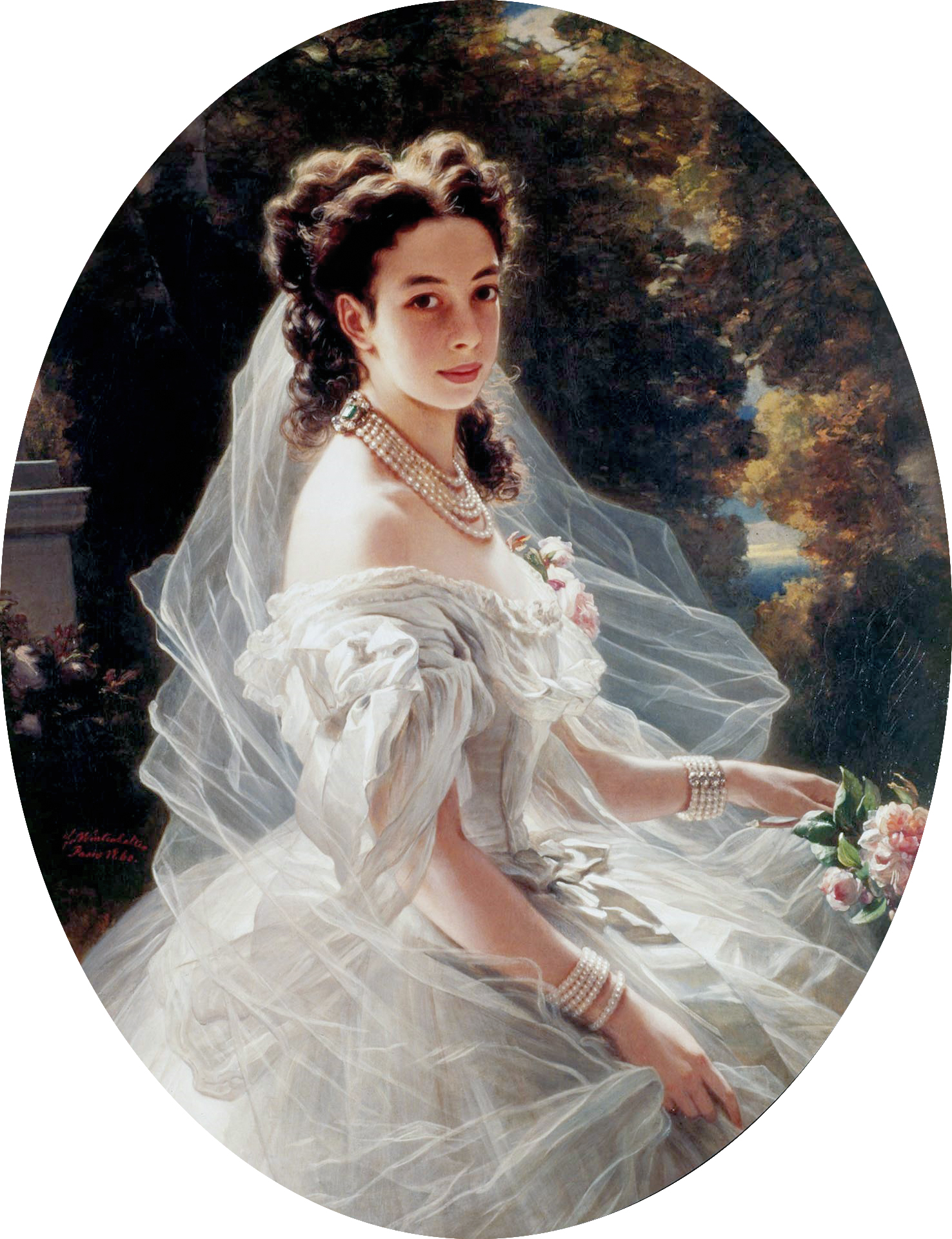
Portrait of his wife Pauline by Franz Xaver Winterhalter, 1860.

In 1856, he was married to his half-niece, Pauline Sándor de Szlavnicza. She was the daughter of his half-sister, Princess Leontine von Metternich (from his father's first wife) and Count Moritz Sándor de Szlavnicza. His wife was thereafter commonly known as Princess Pauline von Metternich. Together, Richard and Pauline had three children:

- Princess Sophie von Metternich-Winneburg (1857–1941), married on 24 April 1878 Albrecht Fst zu Oettingen-Oettingen und Oettingen-Spielberg (d. 1916). Her grandson, Franz Albrecht, Duke of Ratibor u. Corvey (1920–2009), was adopted in 1926/7 by her sister, Klementina, and took the additional surname "Metternich-Sándor"
- Princess Antoinette Pascalina von Metternich-Sándor Winneburg (1862–1890)
- Princess Klementina Marie von Metternich-Sándor Winneburg (1870–1963)

He died on 1 March 1895. Since his marriage produced three daughters, after his death, the princely title of Fürst passed to his half-brother, Paul von Metternich.

According family history Richard von Metternich visited south Sweden in 1858 and a son "Nils Metternich Ekstrand" was born 22 January 1859 (mother Elna Christersdotter, Örkeljunga, Sweden). DNA is available for confirmation through www.myhearatage.com.

== Works ==
During the early 1880s, Metternich edited and published the memoirs of his father, Prince Klemens von Metternich.

== Ancestry ==
Ancestors of Richard von Metternich

8. Johann Hugo, Count of Metternich-Winneburg
4. Franz Georg Karl, Count of Metternich-Winneburg
9. Baroness Clara Luise von Kesselstatt
2. Klemens, 1st Prince of Metternich-Winneburg zu Beilstein
10. Baron Johann Friedrich Fridolin von Kageneck
5. Countess Maria Beatrix von Kageneck
11. Baroness Maria Anna Franziska Eleonore von Andlau
1. Richard, 2nd Prince of Metternich-Winneburg zu Beilstein
12. Baron Franz Georg von Leykam
6. Baron Christoph Ambros von Leykam
13. Maria Theresia von Warnesius
3. Baroness Maria Antoinette von Leykam
14. Antonio Caputo di Petrella
7. Lucia Antonia Caputo di Petrella
15. N.
