= Pauline von Metternich =

Austrian princess and socialite (1836-1921)

Pauline
- Princess of Metternich-Winneburg zu Beilstein
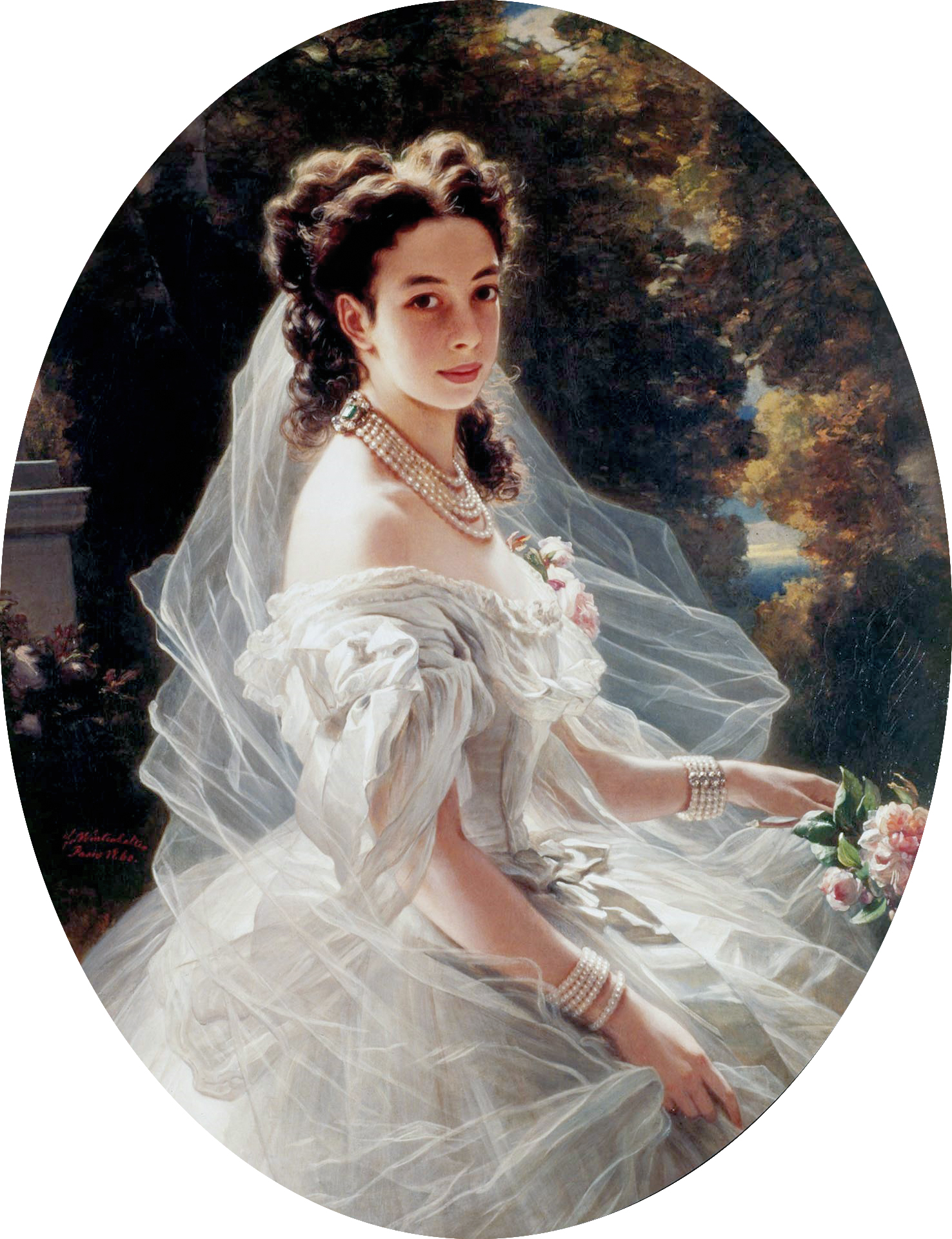
- Portrait by Franz Xaver Winterhalter, 1860
- Full name: Pauline Clémentine Marie Walburga
- Born: 25 February 1836; Vienna, Austrian Empire
- Died: 28 September 1921 (aged 85); Vienna, Republic of Austria
- Spouse: Richard, 2nd Prince of Metternich-Winneburg zu Beilstein
- Issue: Princess Sophie von Metternich-Sandor Winneburg; Princess Pascalina Antoinette von Metternich-Sandor Winneburg; Princess Klementina Marie von Metternich-Sandor Winneburg
- Father: Count Moritz Sándor
- Mother: Leontine von Metternich

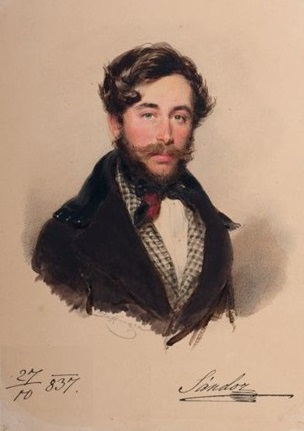
Her father, Moric Count Sandor

Pauline Clémentine Marie Walburga, Princess of Metternich-Winneburg zu Beilstein (née Countess Pauline Sándor de Szlavnicza; 25 February 1836 – 28 September 1921) was an Austrian socialite, mainly active in Vienna and Paris. Known for her great charm and elegance as well as for her social commitment, she was an important promoter of the work of the German composer Richard Wagner and the Czech composer Bedřich Smetana. She was also instrumental to the creation of the haute couture industry.

== Life ==
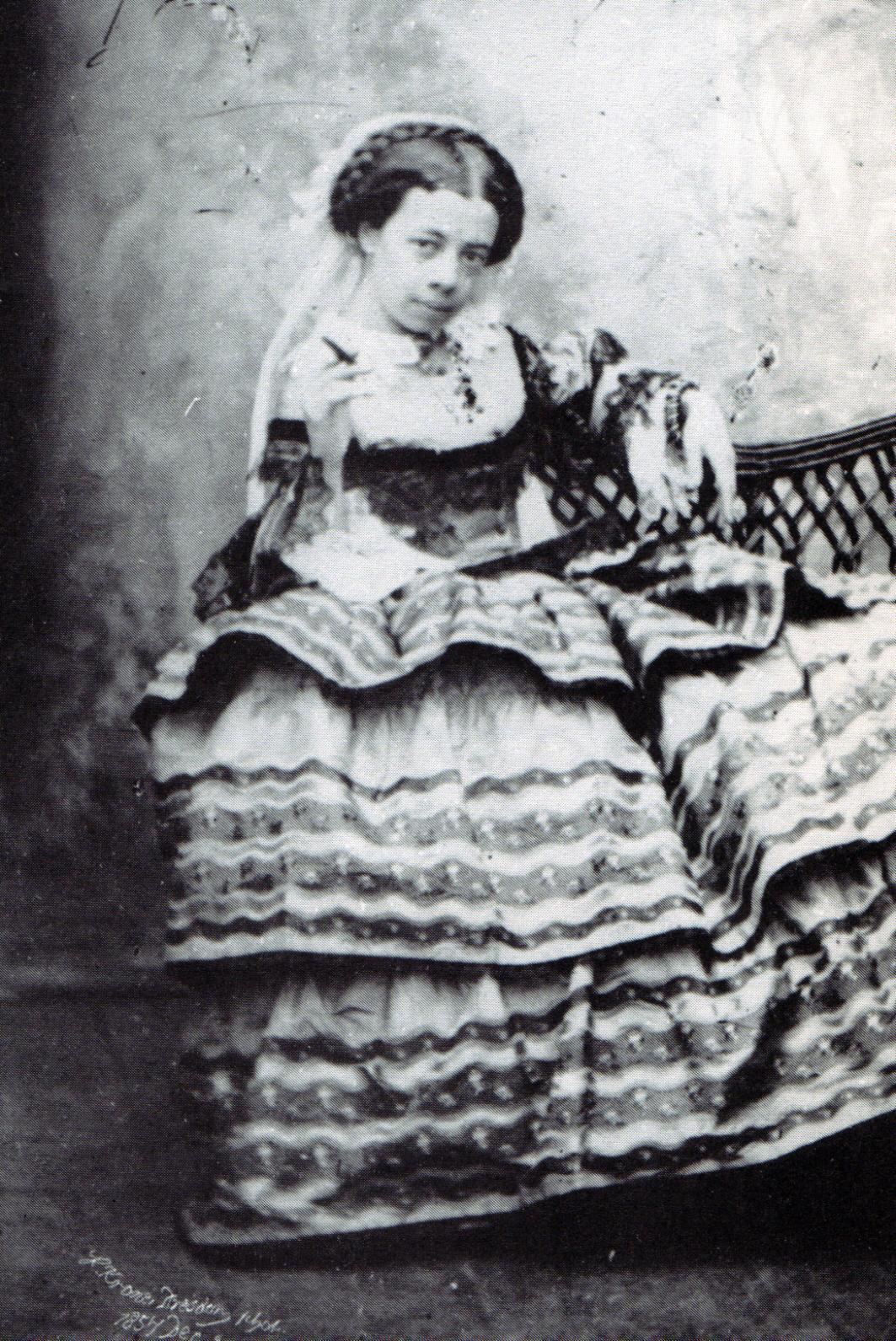
Pauline Metternich, daguerreotype by Hermann Krone, 1854

Pauline was born in Vienna into the Hungarian noble family of Sándor de Szlavnicza. Her father, Count Móric Sándor de Szlavnicza (1805–1878), described as "a furious rider", was known throughout the Habsburg empire as a passionate horseman. He was especially known for his incredible horse stunts and riding over stairs and jumping over other horses and all sorts of curiosities. Her mother, Princess Leontine von Metternich-Winneburg (1811–1861), was a daughter of the Austrian state chancellor Prince Klemens Wenzel von Metternich (known as the architect of the Concert of Europe). It was at his home in Vienna that Pauline spent almost her whole childhood.

In 1856, she married her uncle, Prince Richard von Metternich (1829–1895), whereby her grandfather Prince Klemens Wenzel von Metternich also became her father-in-law. The couple lived a happy conjugal life, despite Richard's frequent love-affairs with actresses and opera prima donnas. Their first child was Sophie (born 1857); her second daughter, Pascaline (b. 1862), married Count Georg von Waldstein-Wartenberg (1853-1890), an insane and alcoholic Czech aristocrat who was said to have murdered her in delirium in Duchcov (today in the Czech Republic) in 1890. Her youngest daughter, Clementine (b. 1870), was badly injured by her dog as a child and decided never to marry due to her scarred face.

== Socialite ==
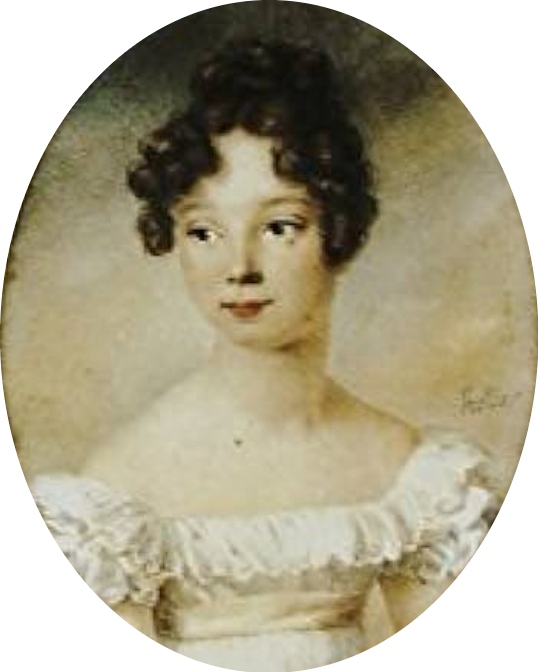
Pauline's mother: Princess Leontine von Metternich

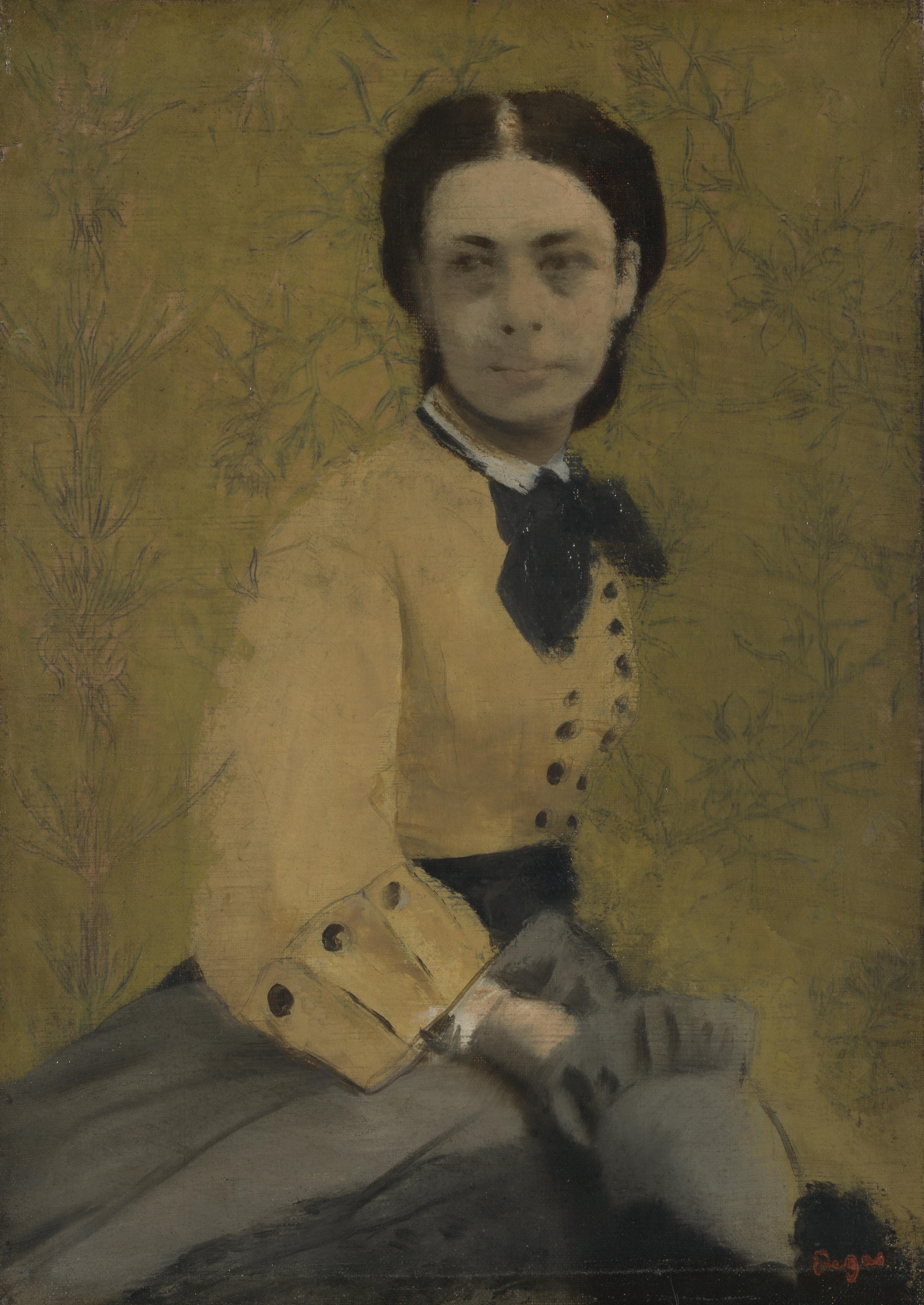
Princess Pauline, portrait by Edgar Degas, around 1865

Pauline accompanied her husband, an Austrian diplomat, on his missions to the royal Saxon court in Dresden and in 1859 to the imperial French court in Paris, where they lived for more than eleven years until the Franco-Prussian War of 1870/71. She played an important role in the social and cultural life of both Dresden and Paris, and, after 1871, Vienna. Pauline's regular travels between, and extended stays in, Paris and Vienna, permitted her to act as a cross-cultural transmitter of the many trends that interested her in music, political ideas, and sport. She was a close friend and confidante of French Empress Eugénie, and, with her husband, was a prominent personality at the court of Emperor Napoleon III. In 1860 she introduced fashion designer Charles Frederick Worth to the Empress and thus started his rise to fame. She was a leading fashion icon; it was said that she was often the very first one to wear a new fashion, which was secondly adopted by the empress, and then accepted and copied by the rest of high society.

Princess Pauline was an ardent patron of music and contemporary arts, and also became a leader of fashionable society. Whether in Paris or Vienna, she set the latest social trends. She taught French and Czech aristocrats to skate, and ladies to smoke cigars without fear of their reputations. She was acquainted with many composers and writers, including Charles Gounod, Camille Saint-Saëns, Prosper Mérimée and Alexandre Dumas, and corresponded with them. She befriended music composers Richard Wagner (who dedicated a piano composition to her) and Franz Liszt, and backed their careers. At her request, Emperor Napoleon III invited Wagner to substantially amend his Tannhäuser for a special 1861 performance by the Paris Opéra, a revision that forms the basis of what is today known as the "Paris version". The project failed (it closed after three performances) and became a celebrated fiasco and one of the greatest music-related scandals of the nineteenth century. Nevertheless, Pauline continued to spread the music of Wagner and other now-famous composers. Wagner later called her his most substantial support beside the Berlin socialite Marie von Schleinitz. One of her protégés was the leading Czech musician of that time, Bedřich Smetana, whom she introduced to the music circles of Vienna and Paris. Thanks to Pauline, Smetana's comic opera The Bartered Bride was produced in Vienna in 1892, to popular acclaim. She also organised salon performances of abridged versions of many famous operas, including Richard Wagner's Der Ring des Nibelungen, in which she took part both as a stage director and singer. The composer Karl Michael Ziehrer dedicated her one of his dances.

In her private life, however, Pauline suffered several crises and disasters. As a child, she was an eyewitness to the bloody Revolution of 1848 in Vienna. In 1870 she remained at the side of Empress Eugénie in Paris during the Franco-Prussian War. Later she aided the Empress' escape from Paris to Great Britain by secretly sending Eugénie's jewels to London in a diplomatic bag. In Vienna, she was admired for her social engagement, but also feared for her gossiping. Her enmity with Empress Elisabeth of Austria was almost legendary and was enjoyed by the Habsburg court. After Elisabeth's death in 1898, Pauline together with Princess Eleonora Fugger von Babenhausen took the leading role of grand dames of the Vienna society.

== Duel ==
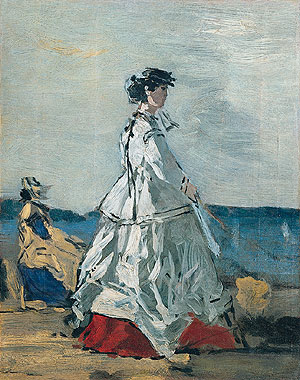
Princess Pauline Metternich on the Beach, painting by Eugène Boudin

It is claimed that in August 1892 Pauline took part in a sword duel with Countess Anastasia von Kielmannsegg (1860–1912). The disagreement supposedly stemmed from a dispute over a floral arrangement at the Vienna Musical and Theatre Exposition, of which the nobles were honorary president and president of the exhibition, respectively. The supposed duel involved the participants stripping to the waist to reduce the risk of a wound becoming infected; the image of two topless nobles captured the imagination of artists and scandalized Victorians. However, there are no primary sources for the story, only accounts from foreign newspapers; furthermore, not long after the first accounts were published, a French newspaper printed a denial by the Princess, in which she calls the story a "ridiculous invention by Italian journalists".

== Legacy ==
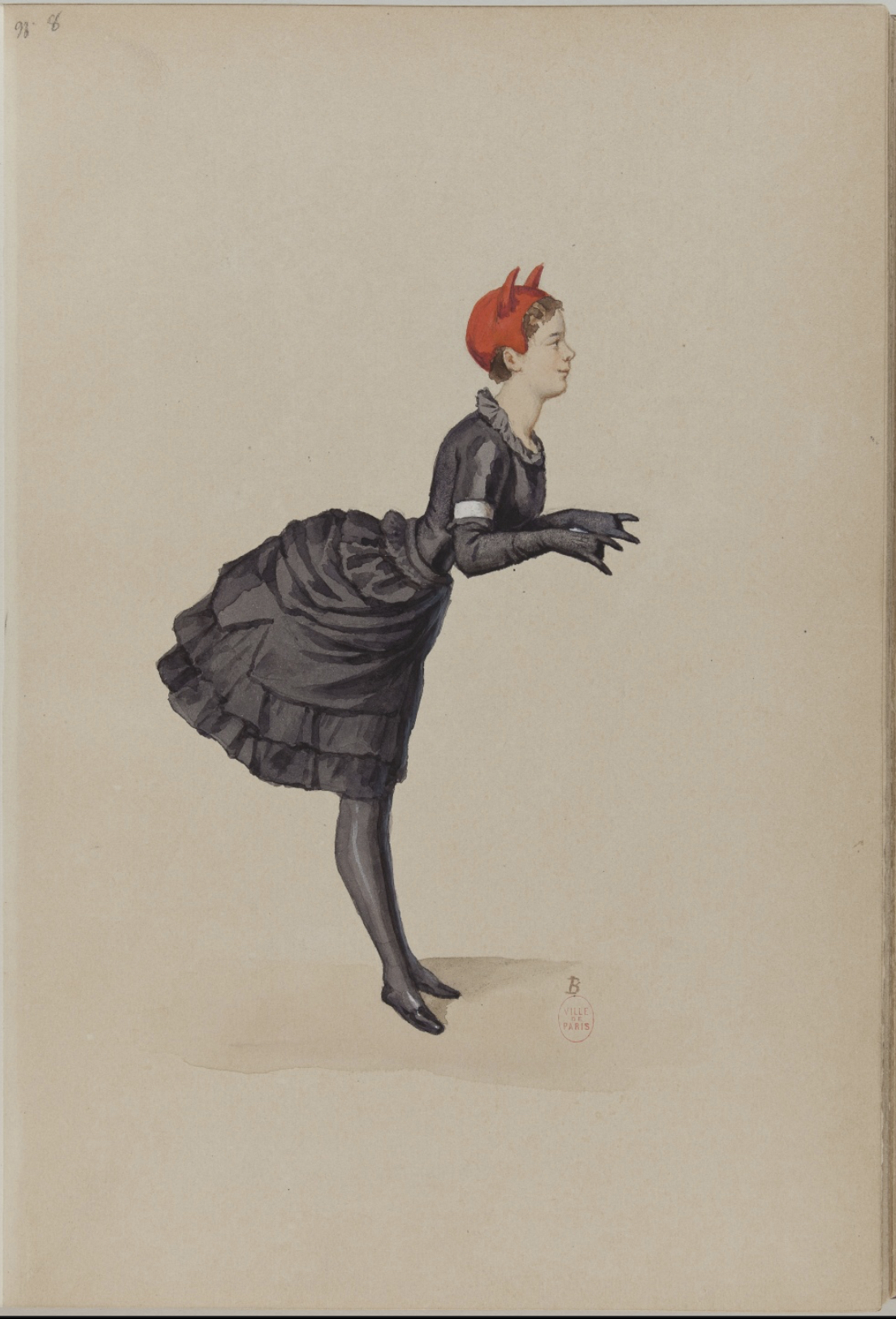
Pauline Metternich in a costume of a devil, by Théodore Gudin

Princess Metternich was a big promoter of arts and music, especially of music of Richard Wagner and Bedřich Smetana. She was one of the last aristocratic patrons of the pre-World War I era, a personality who combined both refined taste and finances to spread contemporary progressive culture. Her influence was equally strong on the development of the modern fashion industry and the beginning of bourgeois fashion designers, most notably Charles Frederick Worth.

Princess Metternich died in Vienna in 1921. She lived through the glory and fall of the Austrian and French empires and was believed to be a living symbol of these two lost worlds. A portrait of her by French impressionist Edgar Degas, painted from a photograph, now hangs in the National Gallery, London.

She wrote two books of memoirs. The first, Gesehenes, geschehenes, erlebtes, in German, honored her grandfather, Chancellor Metternich, and father, Count Moritz Sándor, and the second, Éclairs du passé, in French, recalled her life and times in the court of Emperor Napoleon III and Empress Eugénie. Both were published posthumously in the 1920s.

She herself was remembered in the memoirs of Countess Marie Larisch, who wrote:

Princess Pauline Metternich has always been the acknowledged leader of Society in Vienna. She is very smart, exceedingly clever, and can be exceedingly unkind. I always liked her, and I used to perform in many of the theatricals of which she was so fond. Her entertainments were splendid; she is a born hostess, a typical example of the grande dame, who is unfortunately fast disappearing.

== Issue ==
Richard and Pauline von Metternich had three children :

- Princess Sophie von Metternich-Sandor Winneburg (1857–1941); married Prince Franz-Albrecht zu Oettingen-Oettingen und Oettingen-Spielberg (1847-1916)
- Princess Pascalina Antoinette von Metternich-Sandor Winneburg (1862–1890); married Count Georg von Waldstein-Wartenberg (1853-1890)
- Princess Klementina Marie von Metternich-Sandor Winneburg (1870-1963)

Since the marriage produced no sons, Richard's title of "Prince von Metternich" passed to his half-brother, Paul von Metternich.

== Ancestry ==
Ancestors of Pauline von Metternich

8. Count Antal Sándor de Szlavnicza
4. Count Vincze Sándor de Szlavnicza
9. Countess Eszter Viczay de Loós et Hédervár
2. Count Móric Sándor de Szlavnicza
10. Count Péter Ignác Szapáry de Szapár
5. Countess Anna Maria Szapáry de Szapár muraszombati Szapáry
11. Countess Maria Isabella Batthyány von Német-Újvar
1. Countess Pauline Sándor de Szlavnicza
12. Franz Georg Karl, Count of Metternich-Winneburg
6. Klemens, Prince of Metternich-Winneburg zu Beilstein
13. Countess Maria Beatrix von Kageneck
3. Princess Leontine von Metternich-Winneburg
14. Count Ernst Christoph von Kaunitz-Rietberg
7. Countess Maria Eleonore Gräfin von Kaunitz-Rietberg
15. Princess Maria Leopoldine Elisabeth von Oettingen-Spielberg

== Memoirs ==
- Pauline Clementine Marie Walburga (Sándor von Szlavnicza), Fürstin von Metternich-Winneburg. The Days That Are No More: Some Reminiscences. E. Nash & Grayson, London (1921). ASIN B000881512
- Pauline Clementine Marie Walburga (Sándor von Szlavnicza), Fürstin von Metternich-Winneburg. My Years in Paris. E. Nash & Grayson, London (1922). ASIN B00085ZS7W

== Literature ==
- Octave Aubry, L'Impératrice Eugénie, Paris 1937.
- Jules Gesztesi, Pauline Metternich. Ambassadrice aux Tuileries, Paris 1947.
- Theophila Wassilko, Fürstin Pauline Metternich, Munich 1959.
- Brigitte Hamann, Elisabeth. Kaiserin wider Willen, Vienna 1982.
