= Ochsenhausen Abbey =

Coordinates: 48°03′51″N 9°57′05″E

- Interactive map of Ochsenhausen Abbey

Monastery information
- Order: Benedictine
- Dedicated: 1093

Site
- Location: Ochsenhausen, Germany

Ochsenhausen Abbey (formerly Ochsenhausen Priory; German: Reichskloster or Reichsabtei Ochsenhausen) was a Benedictine monastery in Ochsenhausen in the district of Biberach in Baden-Württemberg, Germany.

== History ==
The traditional story of the foundation, in which there may be some elements of truth, is that in the 9th century, there was a nunnery here called "Hohenhusen", which was abandoned at the time of the Hungarian invasions in the early 10th century. A ploughing ox later turned up a chest of valuables buried by the nuns before their flight, and the monastery of Ochsenhausen was founded on that spot.

The first Abbey Church of Ochsenhausen was dedicated in 1093. The monastery was initially a priory of St. Blaise's Abbey in the Black Forest, but gained the status of an independent abbey in 1391. In 1495 it became Reichsfrei (territorially independent). A pipe organ was built at the abbey by Daniel Hayl the elder in the years 1599–1603.

The abbey was secularised in 1803 (after the Reichsdeputationshauptschluss) and Ochsenhausen became a secular Sovereign Principality for Franz Georg Karl von Metternich (father of famous Prince Klemens von Metternich) and in 1806 its territories were absorbed into the Kingdom of Württemberg.

Many of the buildings still survive. They were extensively refurbished in the Baroque style, so much so that Ochsenhausen is sometimes referred to as "Himmelreich des Barocks" ("Baroque heaven"). The Baden-Württemberg State Youth Music Academy is accommodated in part of them. The former abbey church is now the parish church of St. George's.

== Images ==
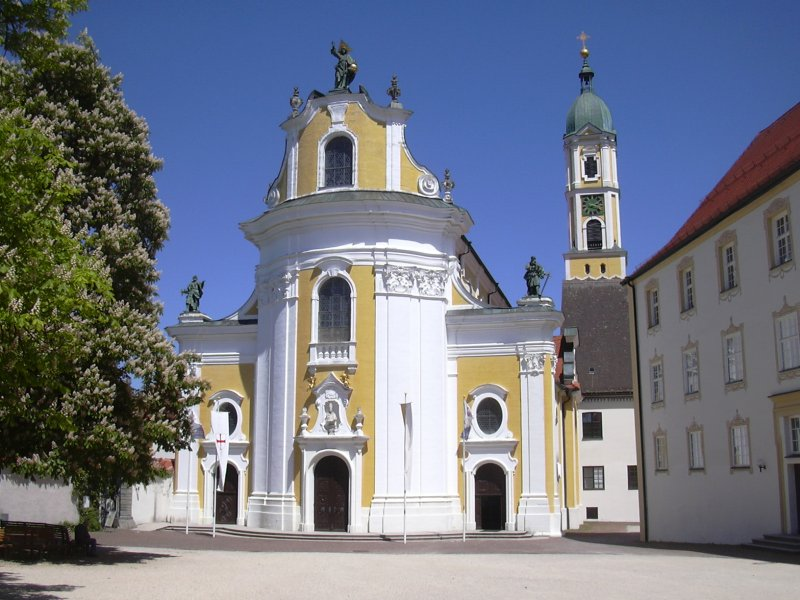
Former abbey church of St. George's, Ochsenhausen

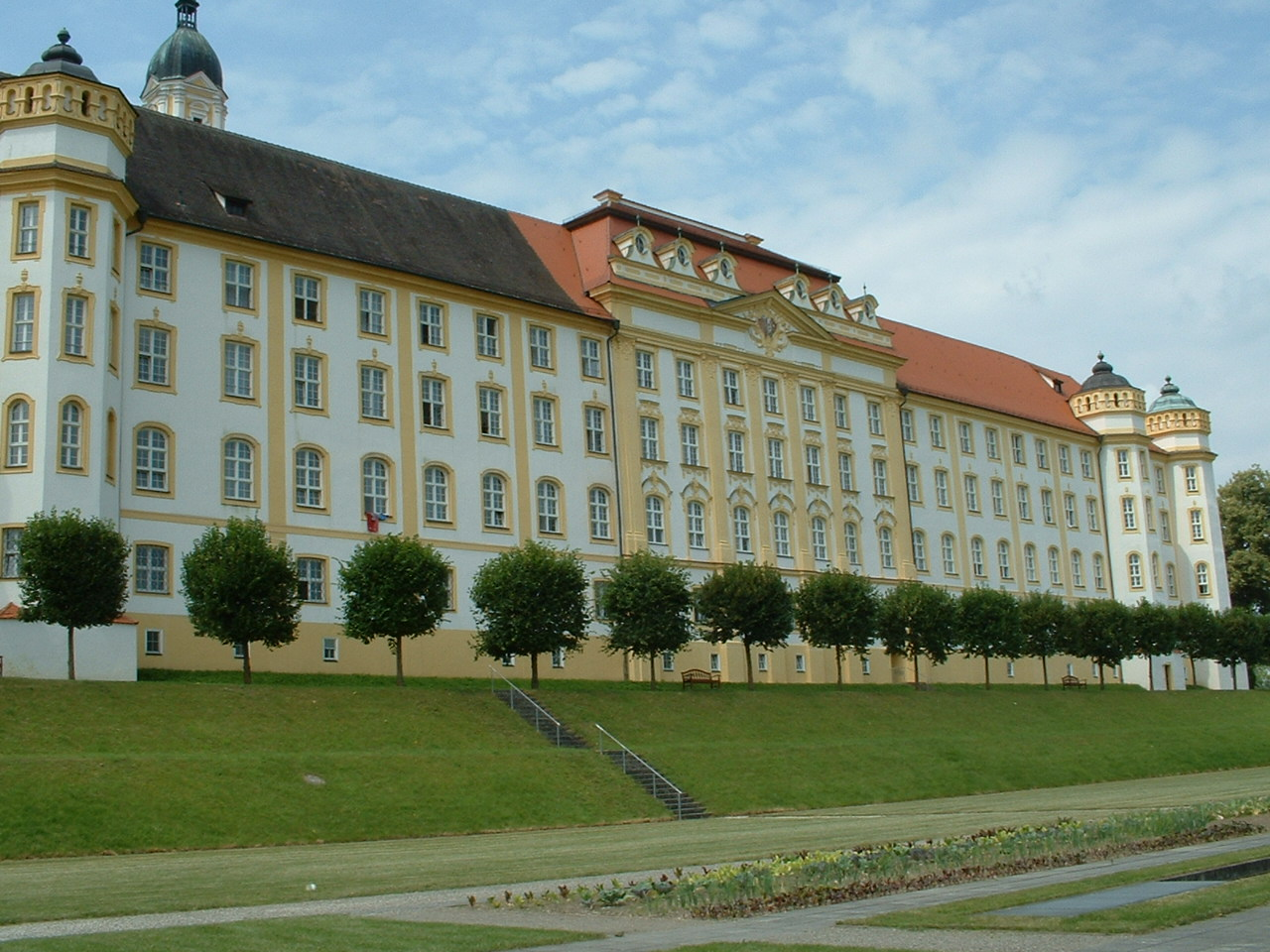
Ochsenhausen Abbey

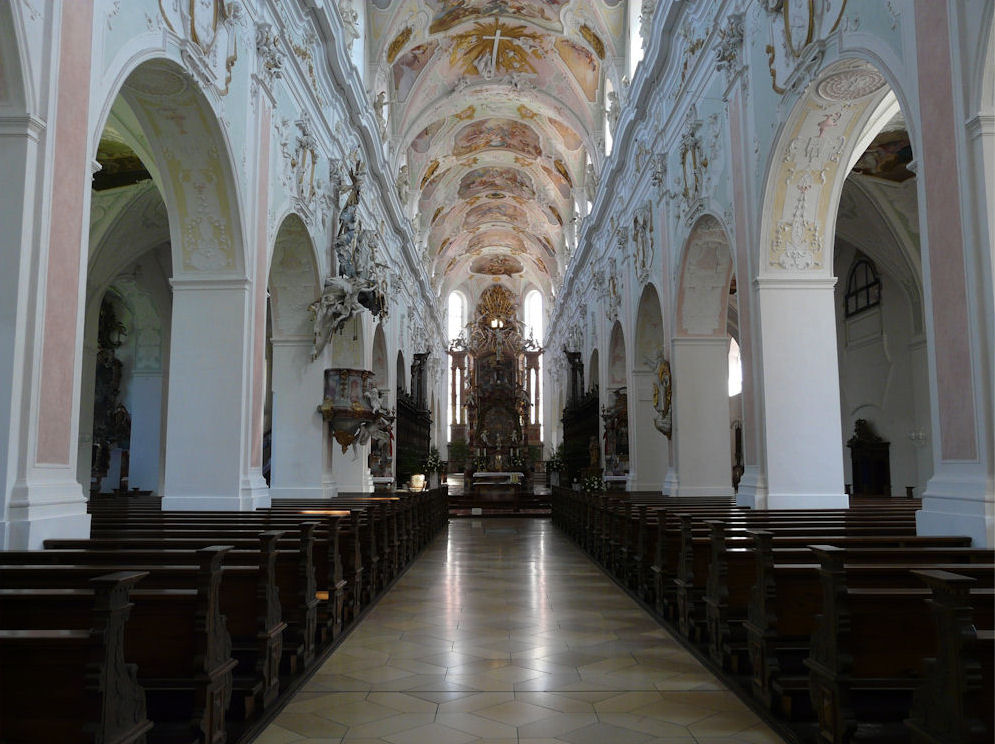
Nave

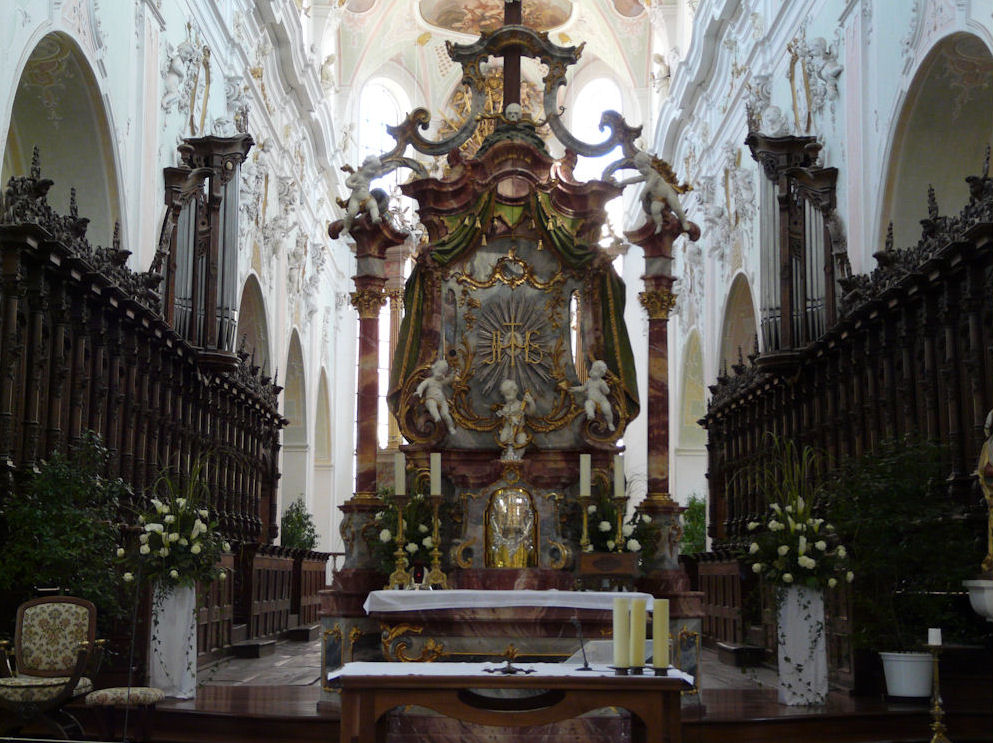
Altar of the Cross

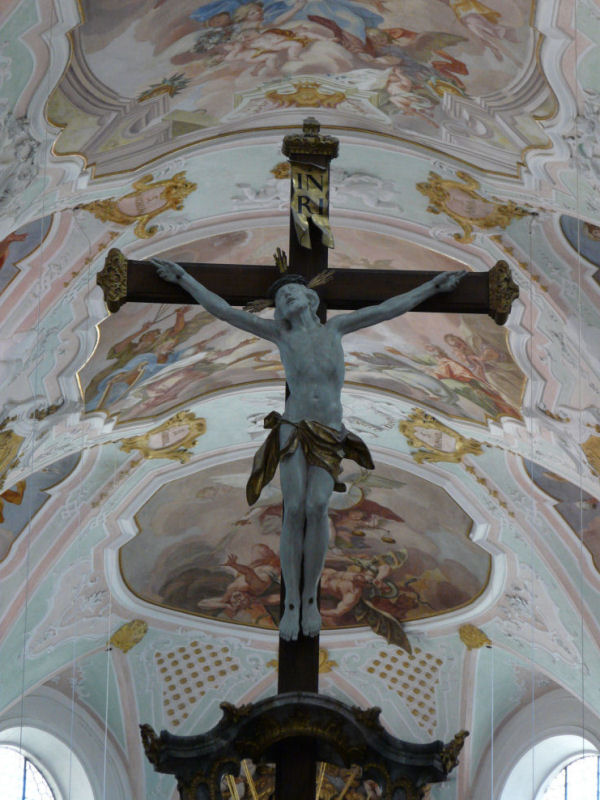
Crucifixion above Altar of the Cross

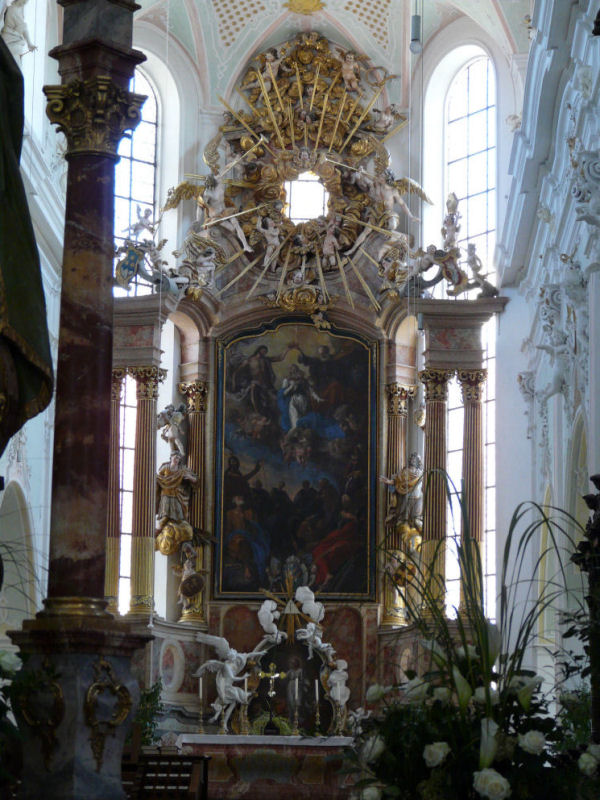
Main altar
Crowning of Mary

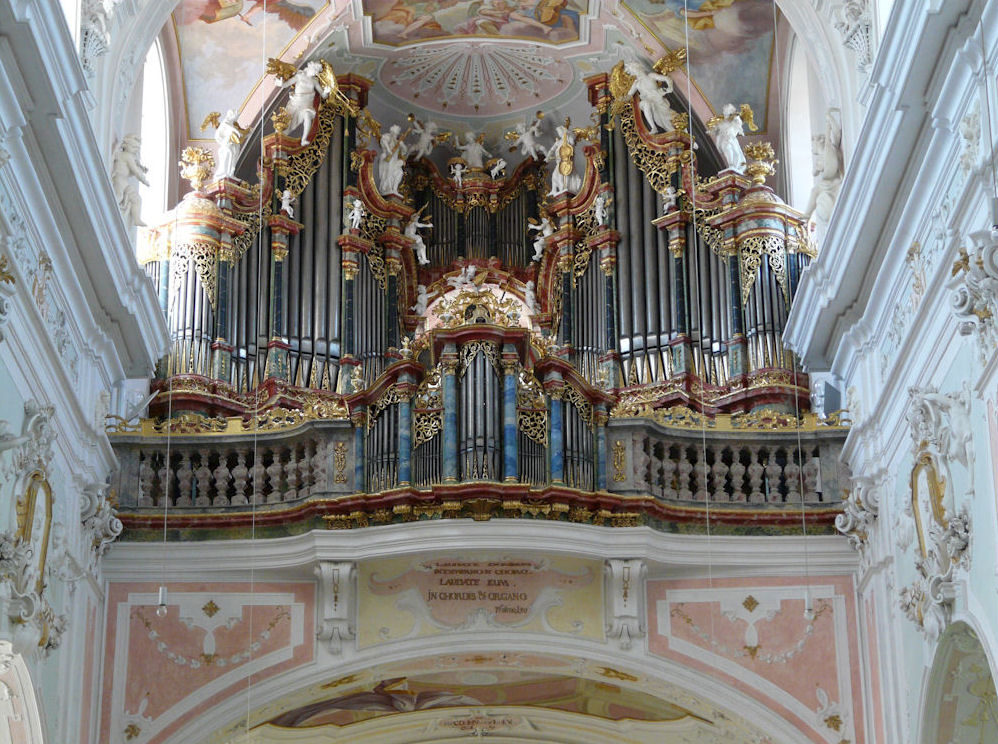
Organ

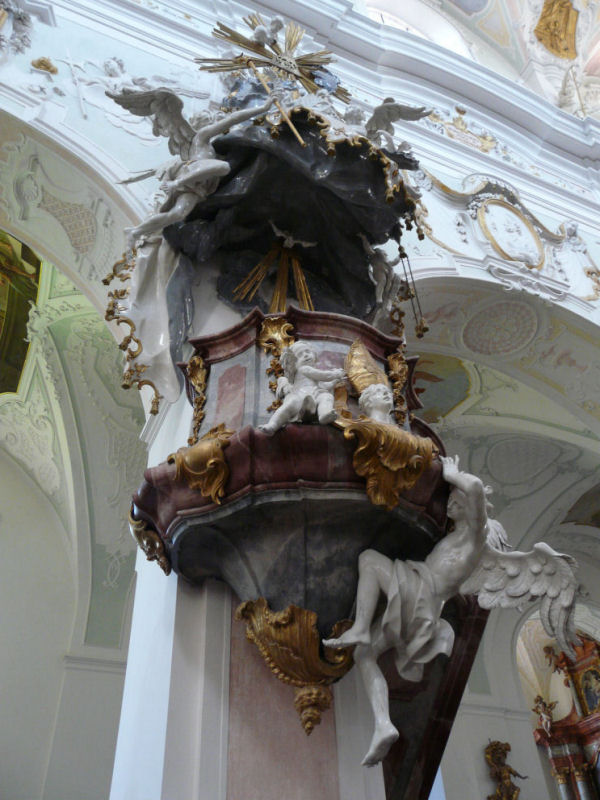
Pulpit

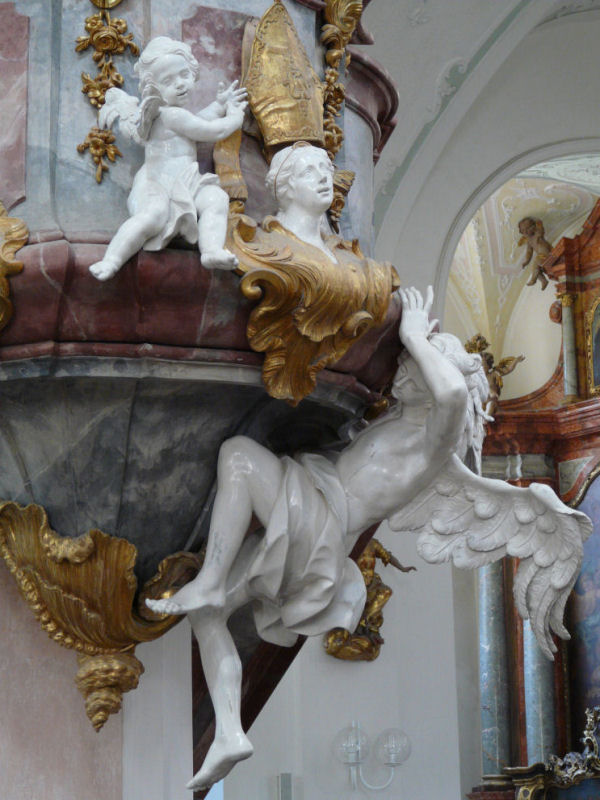
An angel carrying the pulpit

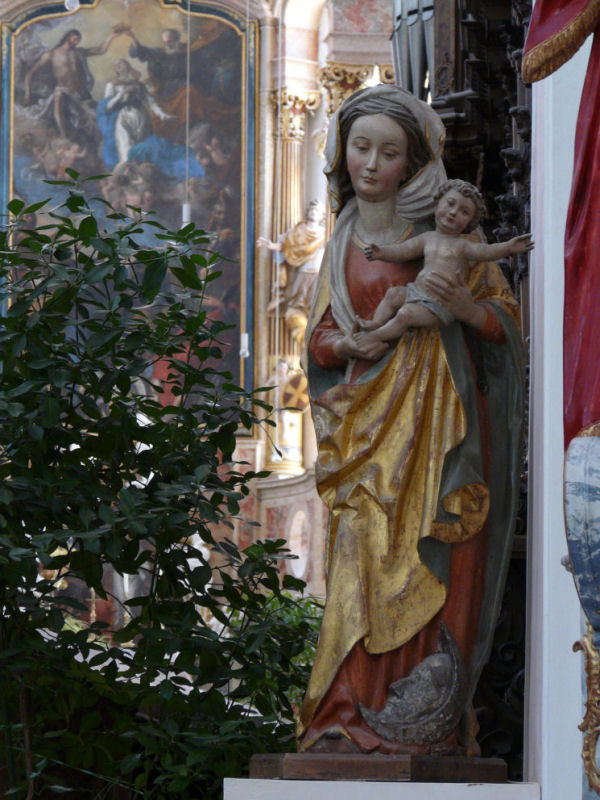
Madonna and child

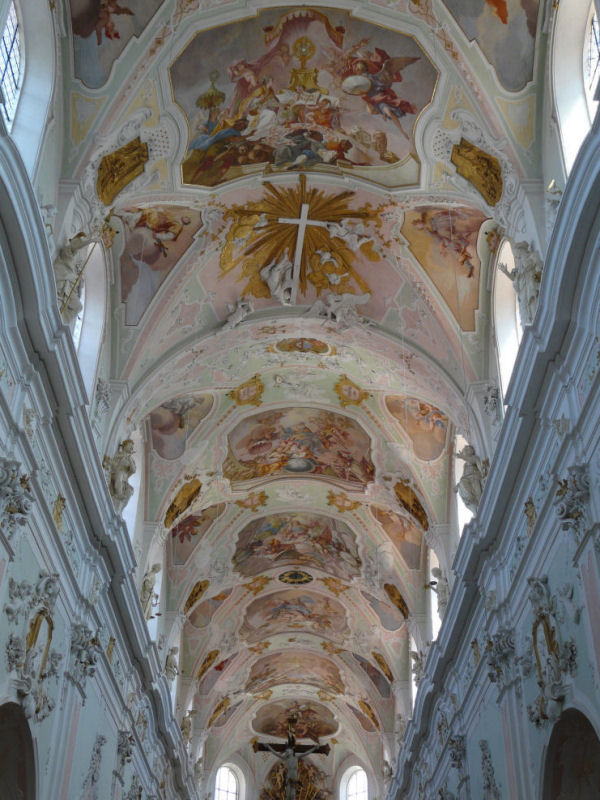
Baroque frescos on the vault

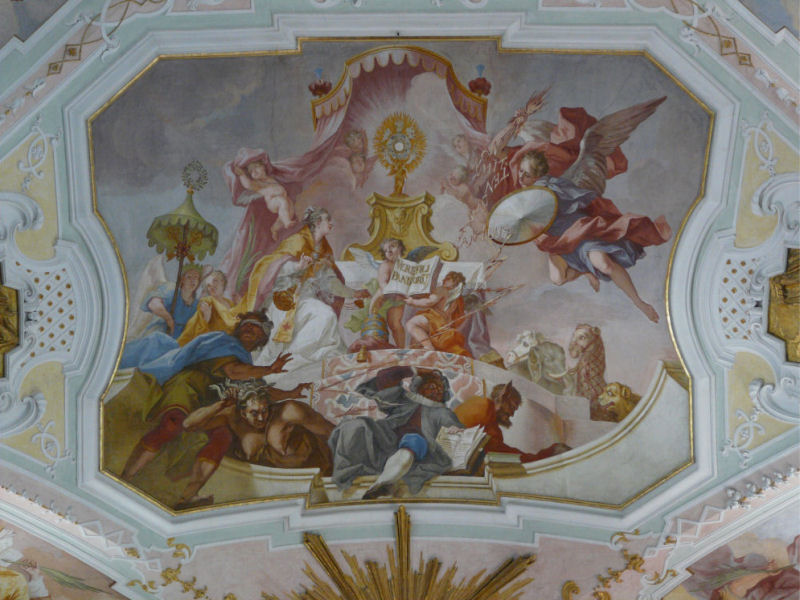
Fresco of the Veneration of the Monstrance

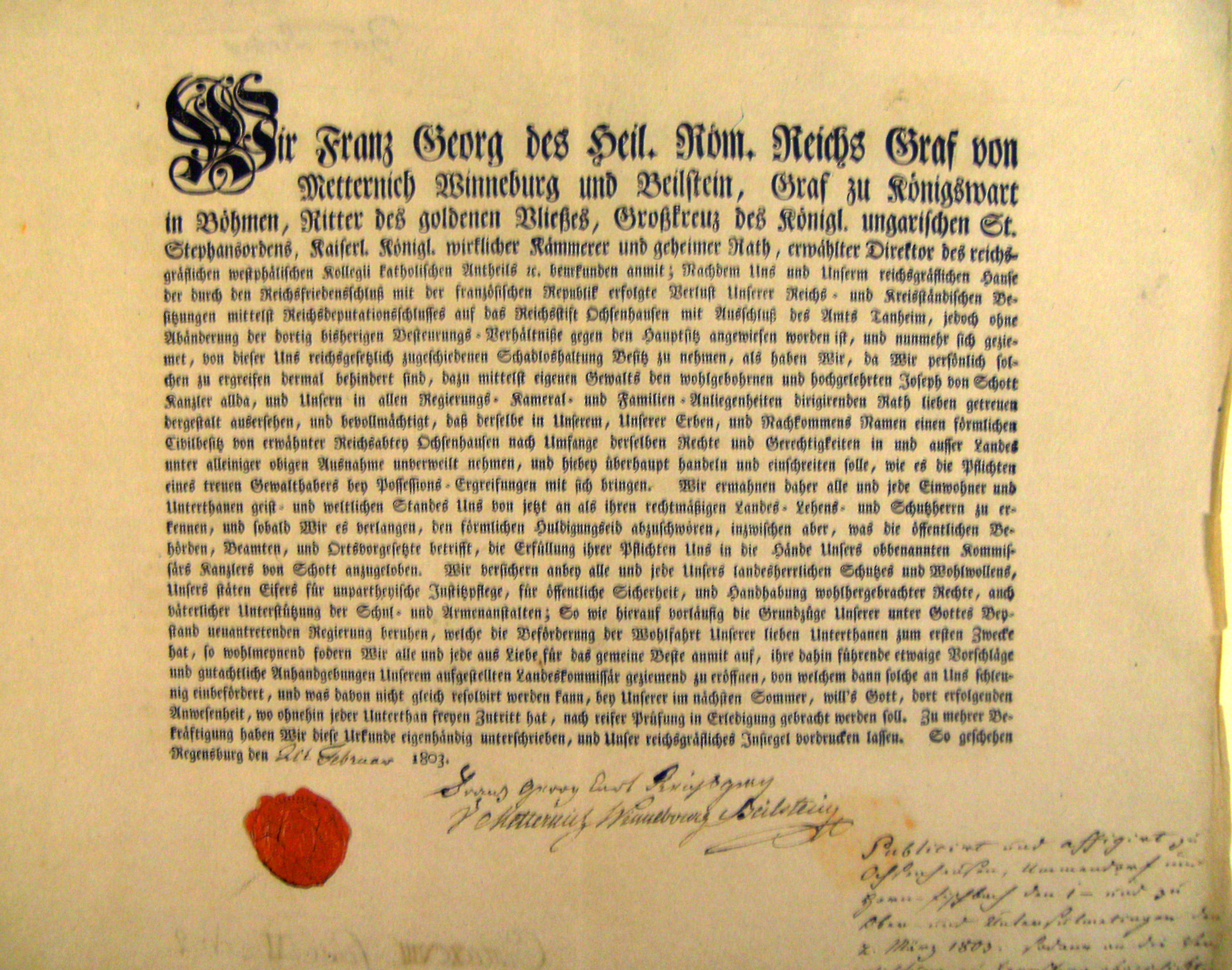
Secularisation charter, February 1803

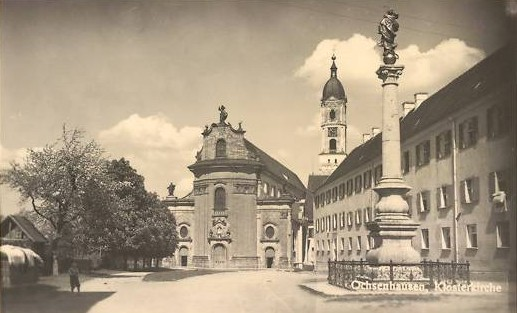
Church of Ochsenhausen Abbey postcard issued c. 1910.

== See also ==
- Lordship of Winneburg and Beilstein
