= Bajna, Hungary =

Bajna
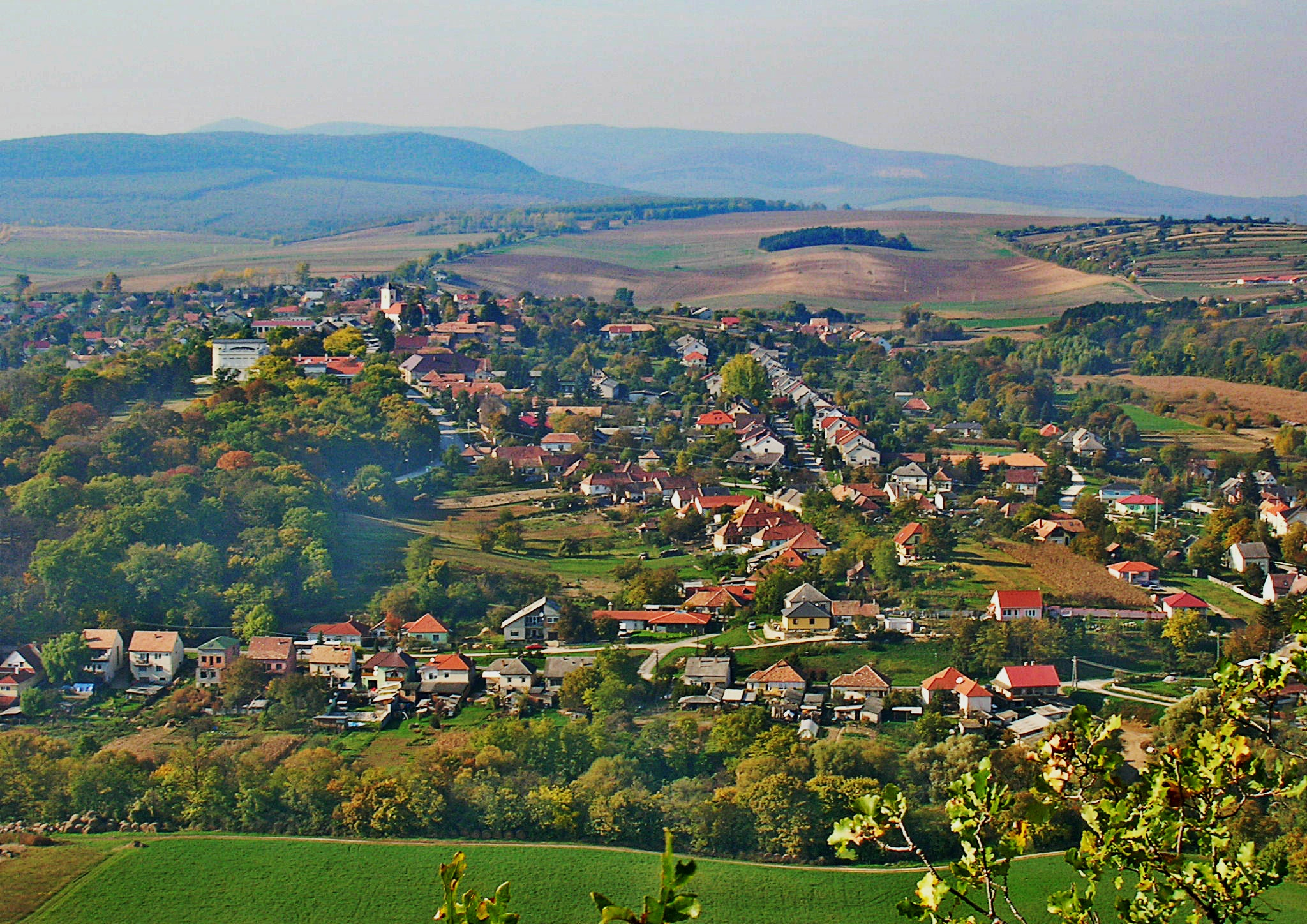

- Seal

- Location of Komárom-Esztergom County in Hungary

- Location of Bajna, Hungary
- Coordinates: 47.65212°N 18.59879°E
- Country: Hungary
- County: Komárom-Esztergom

Area
  - Total: 37.21 km^{2} (14.37 sq mi)

Population (2004)
  - Total: 2,027
  - Density: 54.47/km^{2} (141.1/sq mi)
- Time zone: UTC+1 (CET)
  - Summer (DST): UTC+2 (CEST)
- Postal code: 2525
- Area code: 33

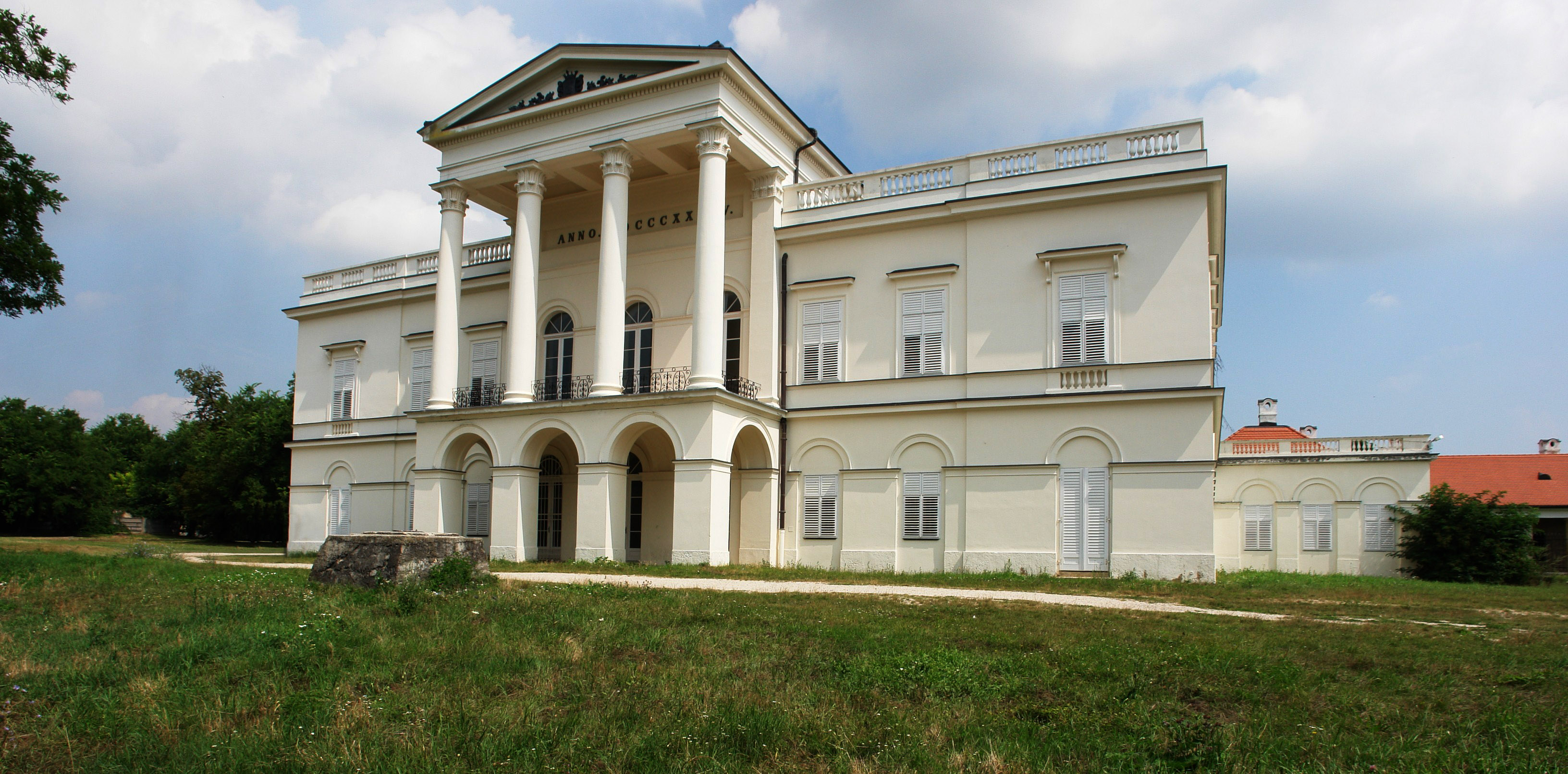
Sándor-Metternich Mansion

Bajna is a village in Komárom-Esztergom County, Hungary. Its main attraction is the Sándor-Metternich mansion.

== Details ==
An old Hungarian family takes the name of this village since the beginning of the 15th century: Both de Bothfalva et Bajna (hu : Bajnai Both).
