= Dittersdorf =

- Municipality
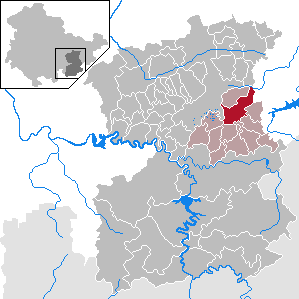
- Location of Dittersdorf within Saale-Orla-Kreis district
- Interactive map of Dittersdorf
- Location within Germany Location within Thuringia
- Coordinates: 50°38′34″N 11°49′0″E
- Country: Germany
- State: Thuringia
- District: Saale-Orla-Kreis
- Municipal assoc.: Seenplatte

Government
  - Mayor (2022–28): Andreas Schmidt

Area
  - Total: 15.67 km^{2} (6.05 sq mi)
- Elevation: 490 m (1,610 ft)

Population (2025-12-31)
  - Total: 450
  - Density: 29/km^{2} (74/sq mi)
- Time zone: UTC+01:00 (CET)
  - Summer (DST): UTC+02:00 (CEST)
- Postal codes: 07907
- Dialling codes: 036648
- Vehicle registration: SOK
- Website: www.vg-seenplatte.de

Dittersdorf (German pronunciation: [ˈdɪtɐsdɔʁf]) is a municipality in the district Saale-Orla-Kreis, in Thuringia, Germany. On 1 December 2010 it absorbed the former municipality Dragensdorf.
