= Concert of Europe =

European balance of power from 1815 to 1914

- 1815 to 1853 – 1871 to 1914
Napoleonic era	League of Nations
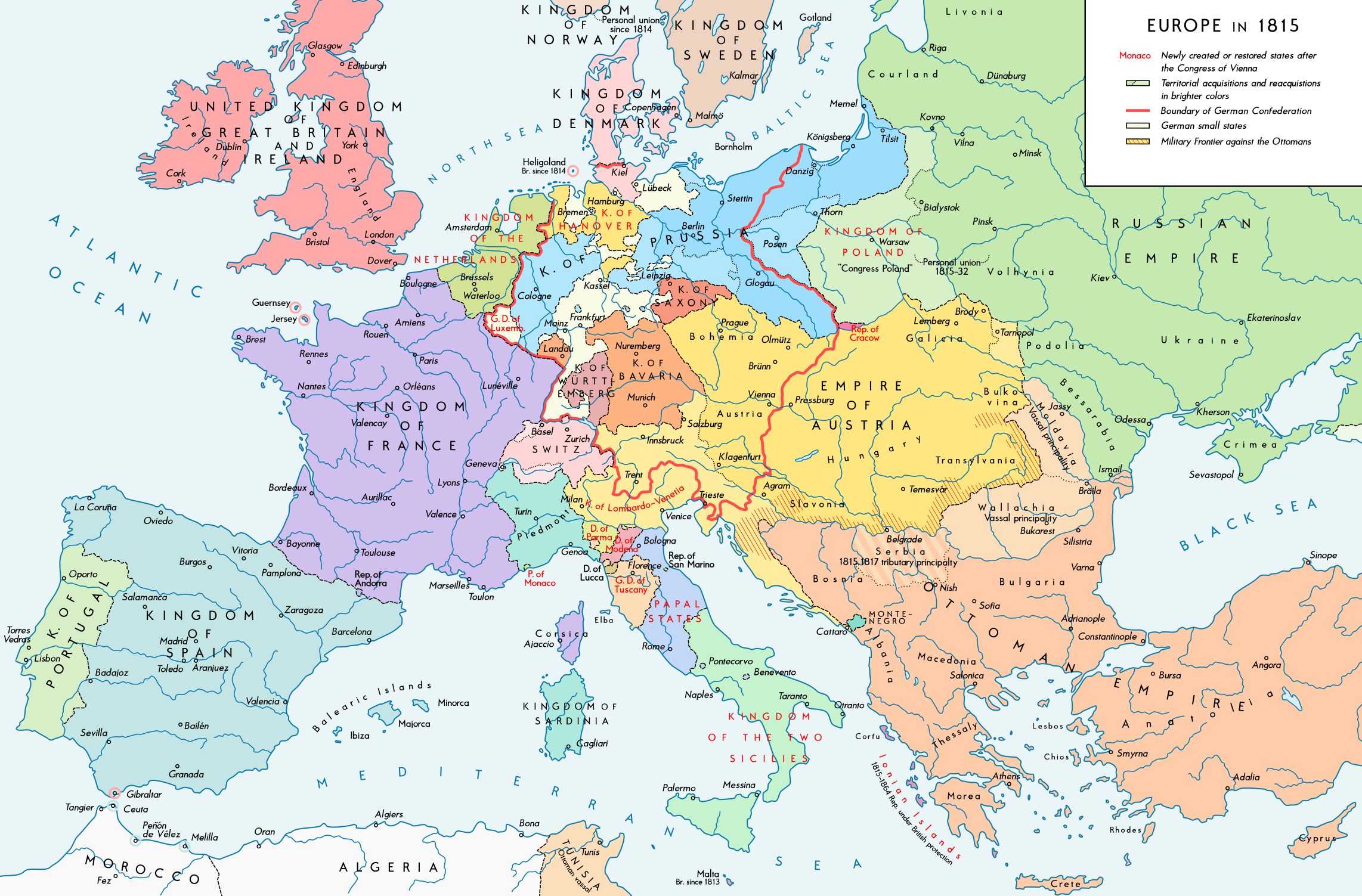
- The national boundaries within Europe as set by the Congress of Vienna, 1815
- Including: Regency era; Bourbon Restoration; Revolutions of 1830; Revolutions of 1848; Causes of World War I

The Concert of Europe was a general agreement between the great powers of 19th-century Europe to maintain the European balance of power, political boundaries, and spheres of influence. Never a perfect unity and subject to disputes and jockeying for position and influence, the Concert was an extended period of relative peace and stability in Europe following the Wars of the French Revolution and the Napoleonic Wars which had consumed the continent since the 1790s. There is considerable scholarly dispute over the exact nature and duration of the Concert. Some scholars argue that it fell apart nearly as soon as it began in the 1820s when the great powers disagreed over the handling of liberal revolts in Italy, while others argue that it lasted until the outbreak of World War I and others for points in between. For those arguing for a longer duration, there is generally agreement that the period after the Revolutions of 1848 and the Crimean War (1853–1856) represented a different phase with different dynamics than the earlier period.

The beginnings of the Concert System, known as the Congress System or the Vienna System after the Congress of Vienna (1814–1815), was dominated by the five great powers of Europe: Austria, France, Prussia, Russia, and the United Kingdom. Initially envisioning regular Congresses among the great powers to resolve potential disputes, in practice, Congresses were held on an ad hoc basis and were generally successful in preventing or localizing conflicts. The more conservative members of the Concert of Europe, members of the Holy Alliance (Russia, Austria, and Prussia), used the system to oppose revolutionary and liberal movements and weaken the forces of nationalism. The formal Congress System fell apart in the 1820s but peace between the Great Powers continued and occasional meetings reminiscent of the Congresses continued to be held at times of crisis.

The Concert faced a major challenge in the revolutions of 1848 which sought national independence, national unity, and liberal and democratic reforms. The 1848 Revolutions were ultimately checked without major territorial changes. However, the age of nationalism ultimately brought the first phase of the Concert to an end, as it was unable to prevent the wars leading to the Italian unification (by the Kingdom of Sardinia) in 1861 and German unification (by Prussia) in 1871 which remade the maps of Europe. Following German unification, German chancellor Otto von Bismarck sought to revive the Concert of Europe to protect Germany's gains and secure its leading role in European affairs. The revitalized Concert included Austria-Hungary, France, Italy, Russia, and Britain, with Germany as the driving continental power. The second phase oversaw a further period of relative peace and stability from the 1870s to 1914, and facilitated the growth of European colonial and imperial control in Africa and Asia without wars between the great powers.

The Concert of Europe certainly ended with the outbreak of World War I in 1914, when the Concert proved ultimately unable to handle the collapse of Ottoman power in the Balkans, hardening of the alliance system into two firm camps (the Triple Alliance and Triple Entente), and the feeling among many civilian and military leaders on both sides that a war was inevitable or even desirable.

== Overview ==
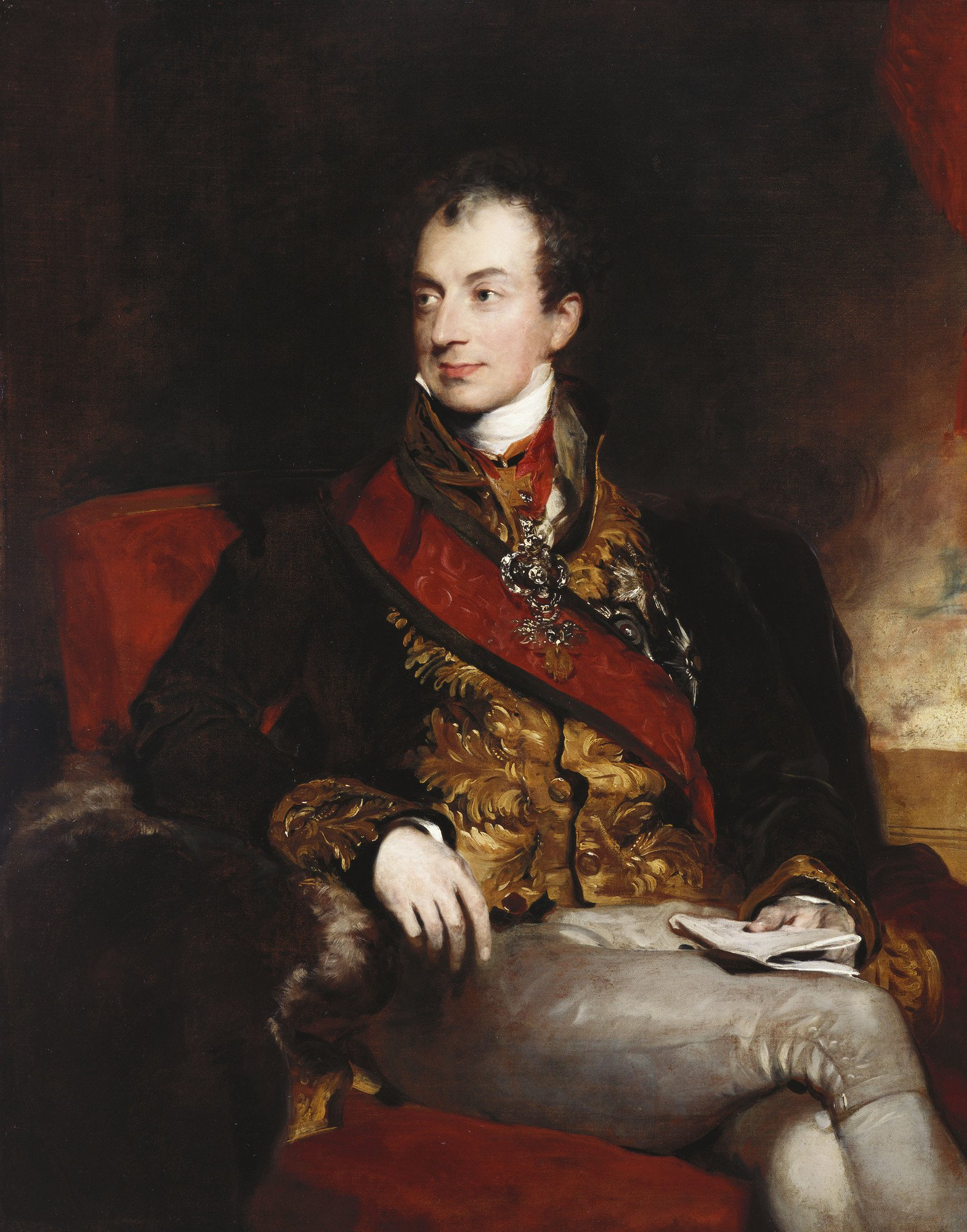
Portrait of Prince Metternich by Thomas Lawrence. Prince Metternich, Austrian chancellor and foreign minister, as well as an influential leader in the Concert of Europe

The Concert of Europe describes the geopolitical order in Europe from 1814 to 1914, during which the great powers tended to act in concert to avoid wars and revolutions and generally maintain the territorial and political status quo. Particularly in the early years of the Concert, the Concert was maintained through the Congress System – sometimes called the Vienna System – which was a series of Congresses among the great powers to resolve disputes or respond to new issues.

The Concert of Europe is typically viewed in two distinct phases: the first from 1814 to through the early 1860s, and the second from the 1880s to 1914. The first phase, particularly before the Revolutions of 1848, is sometimes known as the Age of Metternich, due to the influence of the Austrian chancellor's conservatism and the dominance of Austria within the German Confederation, or as the European Restoration, because of the reactionary efforts of the Congress of Vienna to restore Europe to its state before the French Revolution. The ultimate failure of the Concert of Europe, culminating in the First World War, was driven by various factors including rival alliances and the rise of nationalism. The Congress-focused approach to international affairs continued to be influential in the later League of Nations, the United Nations, the Group of Seven and other multi-lateral summits and organizations.

The Concert of Europe arose from the coalitions which had fought against revolutionary and Napoleonic France. The great powers of Austria, Prussia, Russia and the United Kingdom, had combined with a number of minor powers to defeat Napoleon for the final time in the Hundred Days. In the wake of this victory, these four great powers formalized their partnership in the Quadruple Alliance. In time, France under the Bourbon Restoration was established as a fifth member of the Concert, after the Congress of Aix-la-Chapelle ended the occupation of France and established the Quintuple Alliance. The Ottoman Empire was later admitted to the Concert of Europe in 1856 when the Treaty of Paris, following the Crimean War, recognized and guaranteed Ottoman territory.

== Origins ==
The idea of a European federation had been already raised by figures such as Immanuel Kant, Gottfried Leibniz, and Lord Grenville. The Concert of Europe drew upon their ideas and the notion of a balance of power in international relations, so that the ambitions of each great power would be restrained by the others:

The Concert of Europe, as it began to be called at the time, had ... a reality in international law, which derived from the final Act of the Vienna Congress, which stipulated that the boundaries established in 1815 could not be altered without the consent of its eight signatories.

The Concert of Europe was very much a response to the French Revolution. From the outbreak of the French Revolutionary Wars in 1792 to the exile of Napoleon to Saint Helena in 1815, Europe had been almost constantly at war. All the European powers were short of the funds, material, and manpower necessary for further fighting and therefore sought structures to avoid new conflicts. The military conquests of France had resulted in the spread of liberalism throughout much of the continent, including the adoption of the reforms such as the Napoleonic Code. Having seen how the French Revolution had begun with calls for fairly mild reforms but had quickly led to radical democratic reforms and attacks on the aristocracy, the Concert of Europe also sought to tamp down on liberal and democratic movements across the continent. Finally, the French Revolution also provided a model for nationalist movements and both sides in the Napoleonic Wars had sought to exploit nationalist sentiment when convenient to their war aims. For example, the French supported the nationalist rising in Ireland against the British in 1798 and revived hopes of a Polish state by establishing the Duchy of Warsaw in ethnically Polish lands to help fight the Prussians, Russians, and Austrians. The Allies supported nationalist movements in Spain and Germany to encourage resistance against French-established governments there. Along with the restoration of the Bourbon monarchy in France, the Concert of Europe was in many ways an effort to return as closely as possible to the status quo of Europe prior to 1789.

== First phase ==
The first phase of the Concert of Europe is typically described as beginning in 1814 with the Congress of Vienna, and ending in the early 1860s with the Prussian and Austrian invasion of Denmark. This first phase included numerous congresses, including the Congress of Paris in 1856 which some scholars argue represented the apex of the Concert of Europe in its ending of the Crimean War. At first, the leading personalities of the system were British foreign secretary Lord Castlereagh, Austrian chancellor and foreign minister Klemens von Metternich, and Emperor Alexander I of Russia. Charles Maurice de Talleyrand-Périgord of France was largely responsible for quickly returning the country to its place alongside the other major powers in international diplomacy.

=== The Holy Alliance within the Concert ===
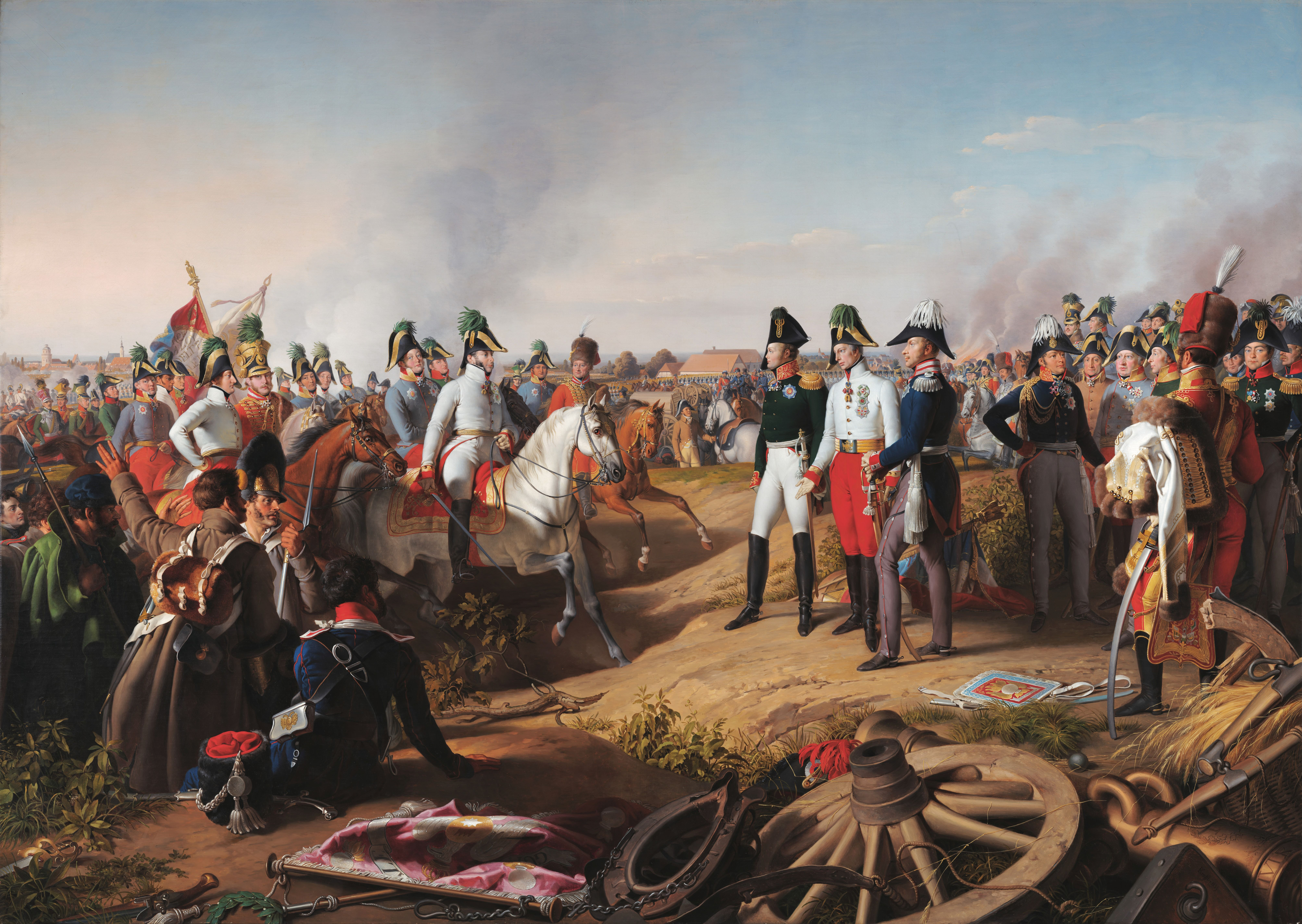
The Declaration of Victory After the Battle of Leipzig by Johann Peter Krafft, 1839. Alexander I of Russia, Francis I of Austria and Frederick William III of Prussia after the Battle of Leipzig, 1813

The Kingdom of Prussia, and the Austrian and Russian Empires, formed the Holy Alliance on 26 September 1815, with the express intent of preserving Christian social values and traditional monarchism.

Britain did ratify the Quadruple Alliance, signed on 20 November 1815, the same day as the Second Treaty of Paris was signed, which later became the Quintuple Alliance when France joined in 1818 with the Treaty of Aix-la-Chapelle.

There has been much debate between historians as to which treaty was more influential in the development of international relations in Europe in the two decades following the end of the Napoleonic Wars. In the opinion of historian Tim Chapman, the differences are somewhat academic as the powers were not bound by the terms of the treaties and many of them intentionally broke the terms if it suited them.

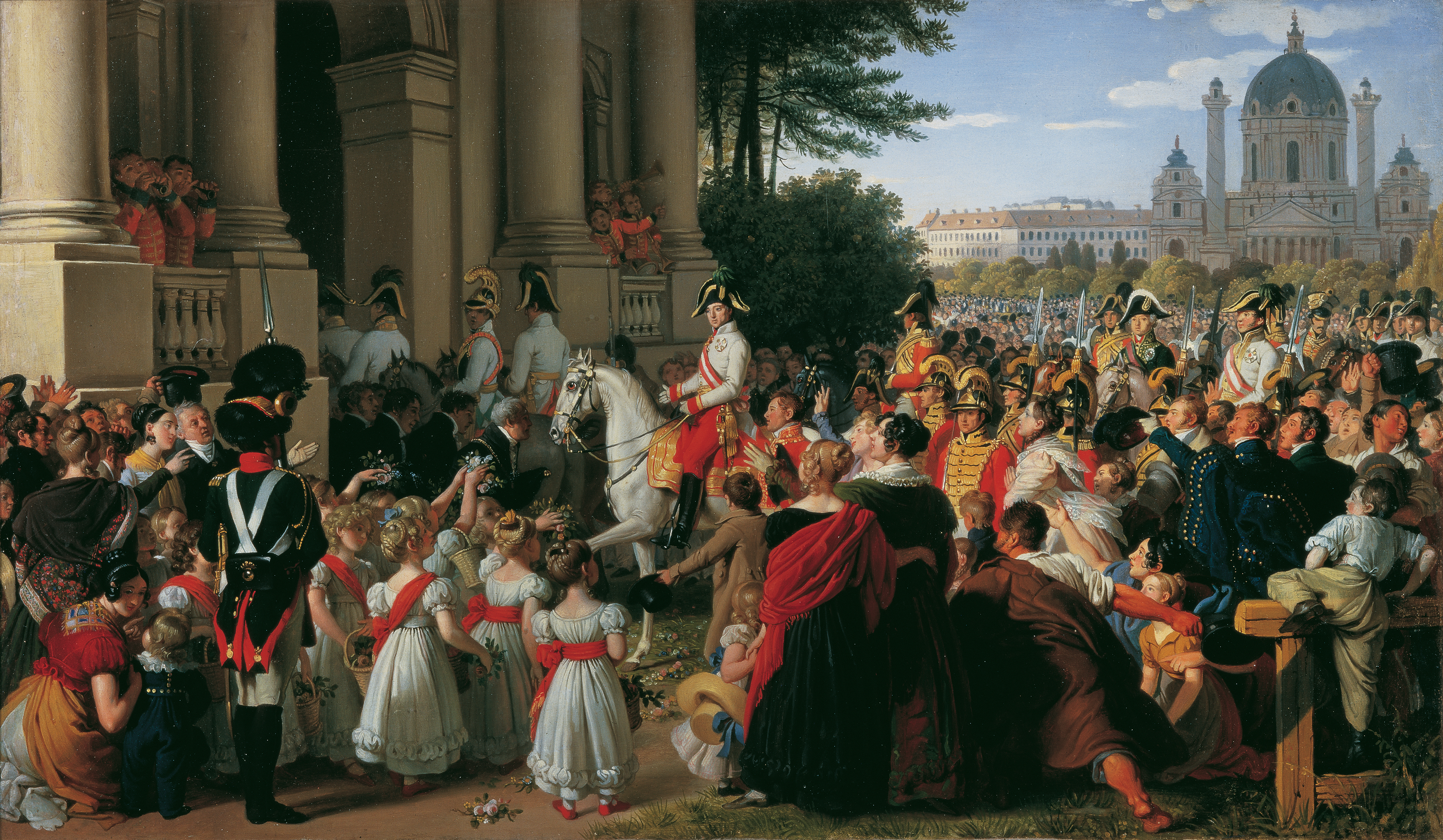
The Entry of Emperor Francis I into Vienna After the Peace of Paris by Johann Peter Krafft.

The Holy Alliance was an informal alliance led by Russia, Austria, and Prussia which aimed to reduce the influence of secularism and liberalism in Europe. The brainchild of Tsar Alexander I, it gained at least nominal support from many states, partly because most European monarchs did not wish to offend the Tsar by refusing to sign it, and as it bound monarchs personally rather than their governments, it was sufficiently vague to be functionally ignored once signed. In the opinion of Lord Castlereagh, the British foreign secretary at the time of its inception, the Holy Alliance was "a piece of sublime mysticism and nonsense". Nevertheless, its influence was more long lasting than its contemporary critics expected and was revived in the 1820s as a tool of repression when Britain and France refused to embroil themselves in certain continental matters.

The Quadruple Alliance, by contrast, was a standard treaty, and the great powers did not invite any minor allies to sign it. The primary objective was to bind the signatories to support the terms of the Second Treaty of Paris for 20 years. It included a provision for the High Contracting Parties to "renew their meeting at fixed periods...for the purpose of consulting on their common interests" which were the "prosperity of the Nations, and the maintenance of peace in Europe". However, the wording Article VI of the treaty did not specify what these "fixed periods" were to be and there were no provisions in the treaty for a permanent commission to arrange and organise the conferences. This meant that instead of meeting at "fixed periods" the meetings were arranged on an ad hoc basis, to address specific threats or disputes.

=== Congress System ===
The "Congress System" was an effort to maintain peace and stability in Europe through regular Congresses of the great powers, similar to the Congress of Vienna, to address pressing issues and resolve disputes through negotiation and coordinated action. The system of regular formal Congresses was short-lived, primarily due to the refusal of Great Britain to take part due to ideological and strategic differences with the Holy Alliance powers.

==== 1814 Congress of Vienna ====
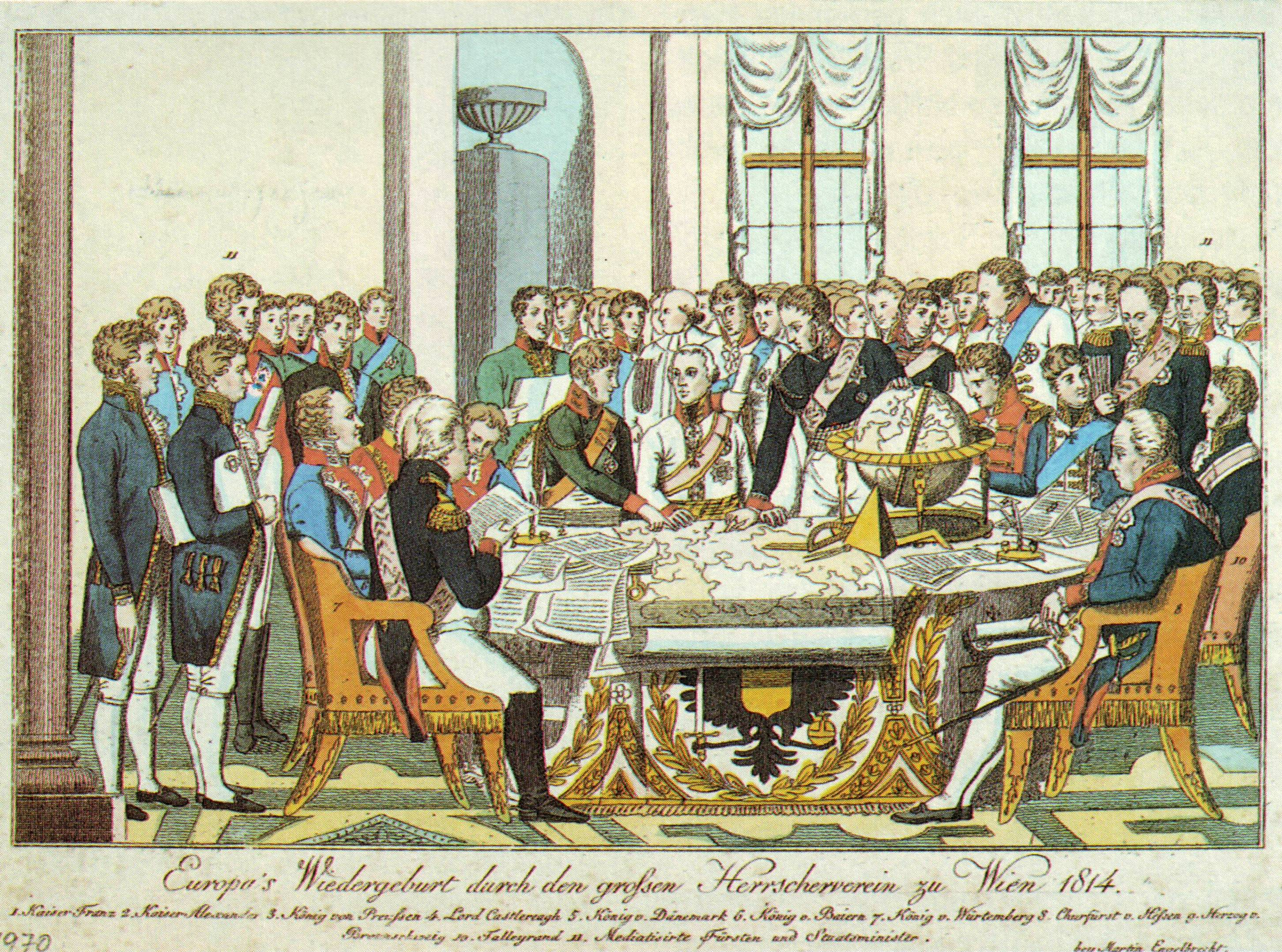
Negotiations at the Congress of Vienna

The Concert of Europe began with the 1814–1815 Congress of Vienna, which was designed to bring together the "major powers" of the time in order to stabilize the geopolitics of Europe after the defeat of Napoleon in 1813–1814, and contain France's power after the war following the French Revolution. The Congress of Vienna took place from November 1814 to June 1815 in Vienna, Austria, and brought together representatives from over 200 European polities. The Congress of Vienna created a new international world order which was based on two main ideologies: restoring and safeguarding power balancing in Europe; and collective responsibility for peace and stability in Europe among the "Great Powers".

==== 1818 Congress of Aix-la-Chapelle ====
The 1818 Congress of Aix-la-Chapelle, Prussia (now Aachen, Germany) formed the Quintuple Alliance by adding France to the Quadruple Alliance, which had comprised the United Kingdom, Austria, Prussia, and Russia. The ability for this to happen was given by Article V of the Quadruple Alliance, and resulted in ending the occupation of France.

==== 1820 Congress of Troppau ====
The 1820 Congress of Troppau was held in Troppau, Austria (now Opava, Czech Republic) by the great powers of the Quintuple Alliance (Russia, Prussia, Austria, France, and the United Kingdom) to discuss and put down the liberal uprising in Naples that caused King Ferdinand I of the Two Sicilies to agree to a constitutional monarchy – which was seen by Prussia and Austria as a threat of liberalism. Other powers present at this Congress included Spain and the Kingdom of the Two Sicilies. At this Congress, the Troppau Protocol was signed, which stated that if States which have undergone a change of government due to a revolution threaten other States, then they are ipso facto no longer members of the European Alliance if their exclusion will help to maintain legal order and stability. Furthermore, the Powers of the Alliance would also be bound to peacefully or by means of war bring the excluded State back into the Alliance.

==== 1821 Congress of Laibach ====
The 1821 Congress of Laibach took place in Laibach (now Ljubljana, Slovenia), between the powers of the Holy Alliance (Russia, Prussia, and Austria) in order to discuss the Austrian invasion and occupation of Naples in order to put down the Neapolitan Revolution of 1820 which had forced the King to accept a constitution. Other powers present at this Congress include Naples, Sicily, the United Kingdom, and France. The Congress of Laibach represented beginning tensions within the Concert of Europe, between the Eastern powers of Russia, Prussia, and Austria, versus the Western powers of Britain and France.

==== 1822 Congress of Verona ====
The 1822 Congress of Verona took place in Verona, Kingdom of Lombardy-Venetia (now Italy), between the powers of the Quintuple Alliance (Russia, Prussia, Austria, France, and the United Kingdom), along with Spain, Sicily, and Naples. This Congress dealt with the question of Spanish revolution of 1820; Russia, Prussia, and Austria agreed to support France's planned intervention in Spain, while the United Kingdom opposed it. This Congress also looked to deal with the Greek Revolution against Turkey, but due to the opposition of the United Kingdom and Austria to Russian intervention in the Balkans, the Congress of Verona did not end up addressing this issue.

=== Collapse of the Congress System ===
==== Protocol of St. Petersburg (1826) ====
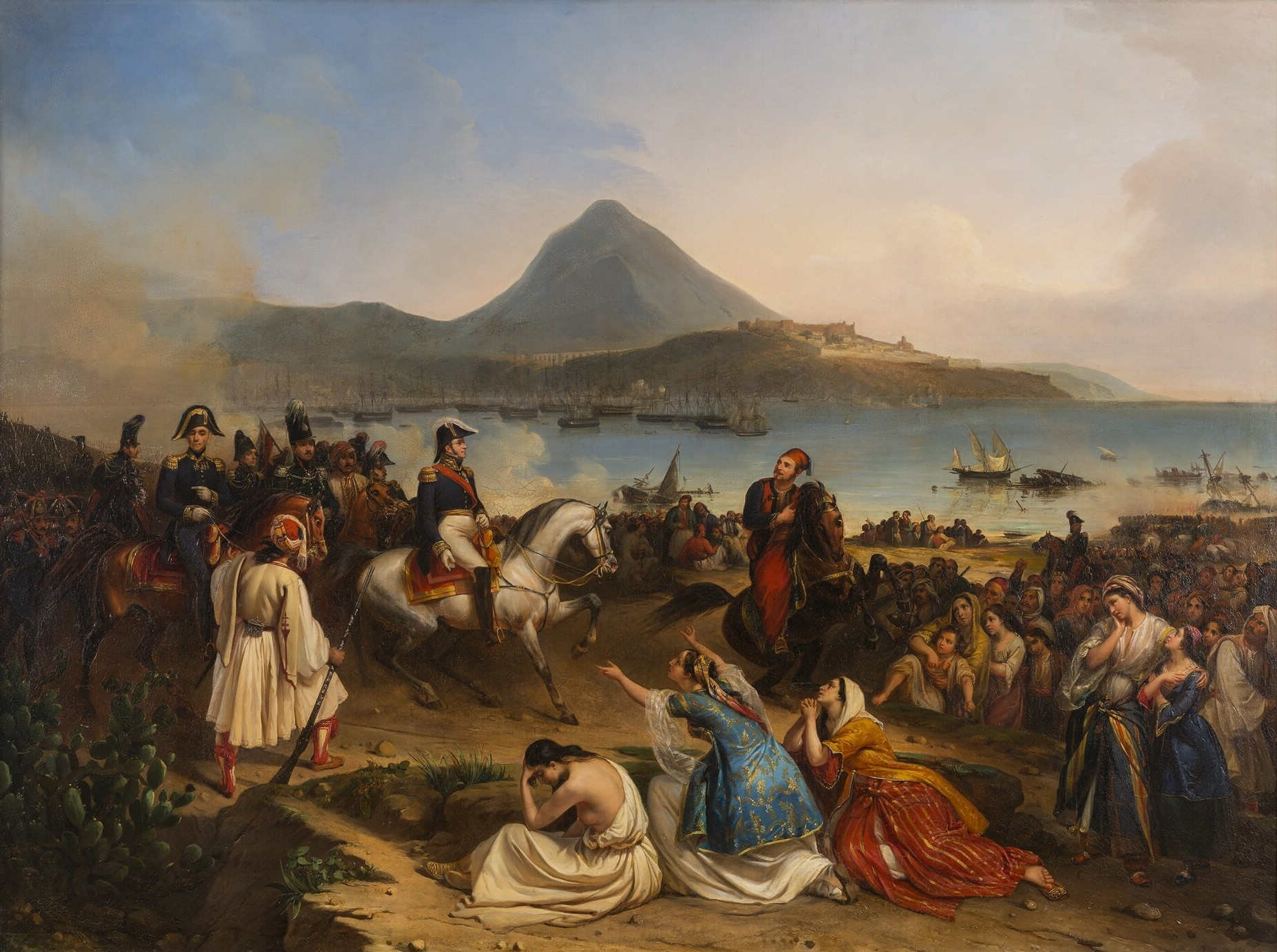
General Maison meeting Ibrahim Pasha in Navarino in September 1828

The Protocol of St. Petersburg is often cited as the end of the Congress System, as it represented the failure of the Congress of St. Petersburg (1825) to resolve the question of the Greek War of Independence against the Ottomans. Russia, seeking territory and influence in the Black Sea and the Balkans, and to protect the Eastern Orthodox Christians under Muslim Ottoman rule, supported Greek independence and was dissatisfied with other Powers' desire to treat the uprising as an internal matter and support for the status quo. Russia and the United Kingdom entered a bilateral agreement to enforce their plan, by war if necessary, for a mediated end to the conflict with Greek autonomy within the Ottoman Empire. The other great powers were not consulted in this Protocol and though France later joined, Austria and Prussia opposed the Protocol and the threat it posed to the conservative, anti-nationalist stability they sought to impose on Europe. The Ottomans also rejected the Protocol until their defeat at the Battle of Navarino at the hands of the British, French, Russian, and Greek forces forced them to the negotiating table.

==== 1830 London Conference ====
The London Conference of 1830 dealt with the question of the Belgian–Dutch conflict, which was caused by the 1830 Belgian Revolution where Belgium separated from the United Kingdom of the Netherlands. Austria, Prussia, and Russia saw Belgium's separation as a threat to stability, inviting further revolutions and revolts, and sought to return to the status quo ante. On the other hand, France, now led by the more liberal July Monarchy as a result of its own 1830 revolution, supported Belgium's independence, as much of the impetus came from the lack of power of the Francophone and Catholic residents. The United Kingdom was very wary of French plans to annex parts of Belgium, but when no powers were willing to send troops to support the Dutch, and with the ascension of a more liberal Whig government, eventually supported the creation of an independent, neutral Belgium as a buffer state, to which the other Great Powers ultimately agreed.

==== Oriental Crisis (1840) ====
The Ottoman Empire faced an internal revolt in the 1830s led by the viceroy of Egypt, Muhammad Ali Pasha, who sought to create an empire and remove Egypt and Sudan from Ottoman suzerainty. Muhammad Ali's demand for control of parts of the Levant and subsequent invasion of Syria threatened to topple the weak Ottoman regime and brought the issue to a head in what became known as the Oriental Crisis of 1840. The Ottomans were supported by Austria, Britain, Prussia, and Russia who sought stability and continuity. France, however, supported Muhammad Ali, a longtime ally in North Africa, hoping to further increase French influence in the Mediterranean through a French-aligned independent Egypt. However, the other four powers agreed in the Convention of London (1840) to act without France. A joint British-Austrian force attacked Egyptian forces and forced Muhammad Ali to accept the Ottoman terms. France threatened war on behalf of Egypt and tried to seek territorial compensation in Europe by reclaiming the Left Bank of the Rhine leading to the Rhine Crisis. However, within a few months, the bellicose French government lost support and the Prime Minister Adolphe Thiers resigned and France's new government fell into step with the other great powers. The Oriental Crisis showed that important political questions would still be decided by the great powers; but it also illustrated the destabilizing effect the continued weakening of the Ottoman Empire (the so-called Eastern Question) had on the balance of power. The sabre-rattling triggered several powers to embark on the most significant armament and fortification projects since Napoleon, particularly in France and the German Confederation.

=== Decline of the first phase ===
==== Revolutions of 1848 ====
The Concert was challenged by the Revolutions of 1848 but was ultimately successful in preventing major changes to the map of Europe. However, the revolts, which combined nationalist and liberal ideas, posed a real threat to the conservative order that had reigned since 1815, as shown by the success of the French uprising ending the July Monarchy and ushering in the Second Republic. However, in response, Austria, Prussia, Russia, and even republican France worked – and in some cases coordinate closely – to defeat the uprisings in Germany, Italy, and Eastern Europe. Britain also sought to preserve the status quo, providing no support to the revolutionaries, and mainly seeking to ensure that no other powers managed to leverage the uprisings into expanded influence in areas of British interest, such as the Mediterranean and the Low Countries.

==== Crimean War and the 1856 Congress of Paris ====
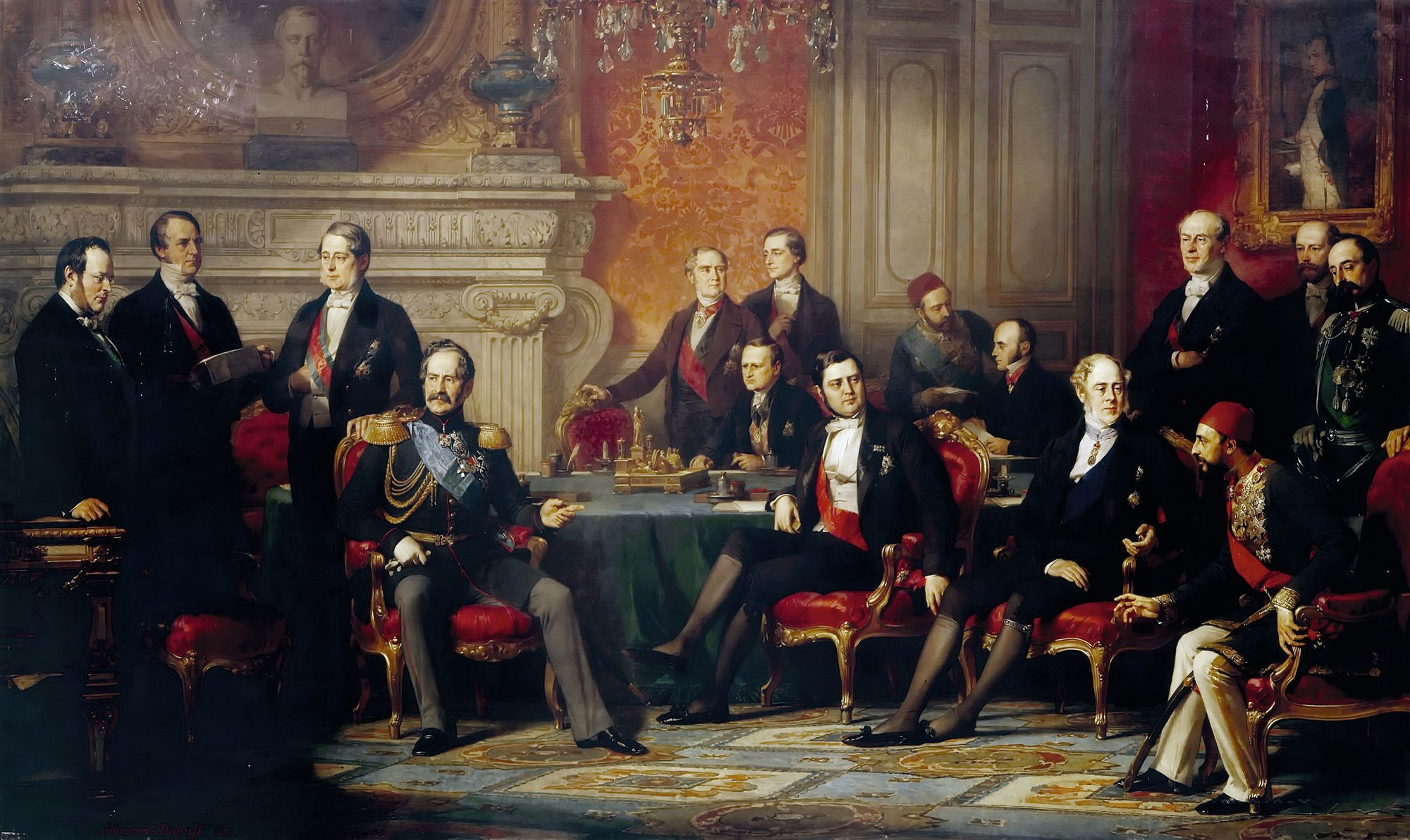
Diplomats assembled at Congress of Paris. The Congress of Paris by Edouard Dubufe

Sometimes viewed as the end of the first phase, the next blow to the Concert was the Crimean War, the first war between Great Powers since Napoleon. However, the war was marked by being geographically limited to the Crimea and Danubian Principalities rather than a general European war, numerous peace overtures, and serial efforts by the great powers to find a diplomatic solution. The war also illustrated a key piece of the balance of power theory, when the combined efforts of several great powers were marshaled to check the ambitions of a single rival to prevent it becoming too powerful.

The war ended in 1856 with the Congress of Paris, which is sometimes viewed as the pinnacle of the Concert with all outstanding issues surrounding the conflict resolved in a single Congress and resulting in a single treaty.

==== Wars of national unification ====
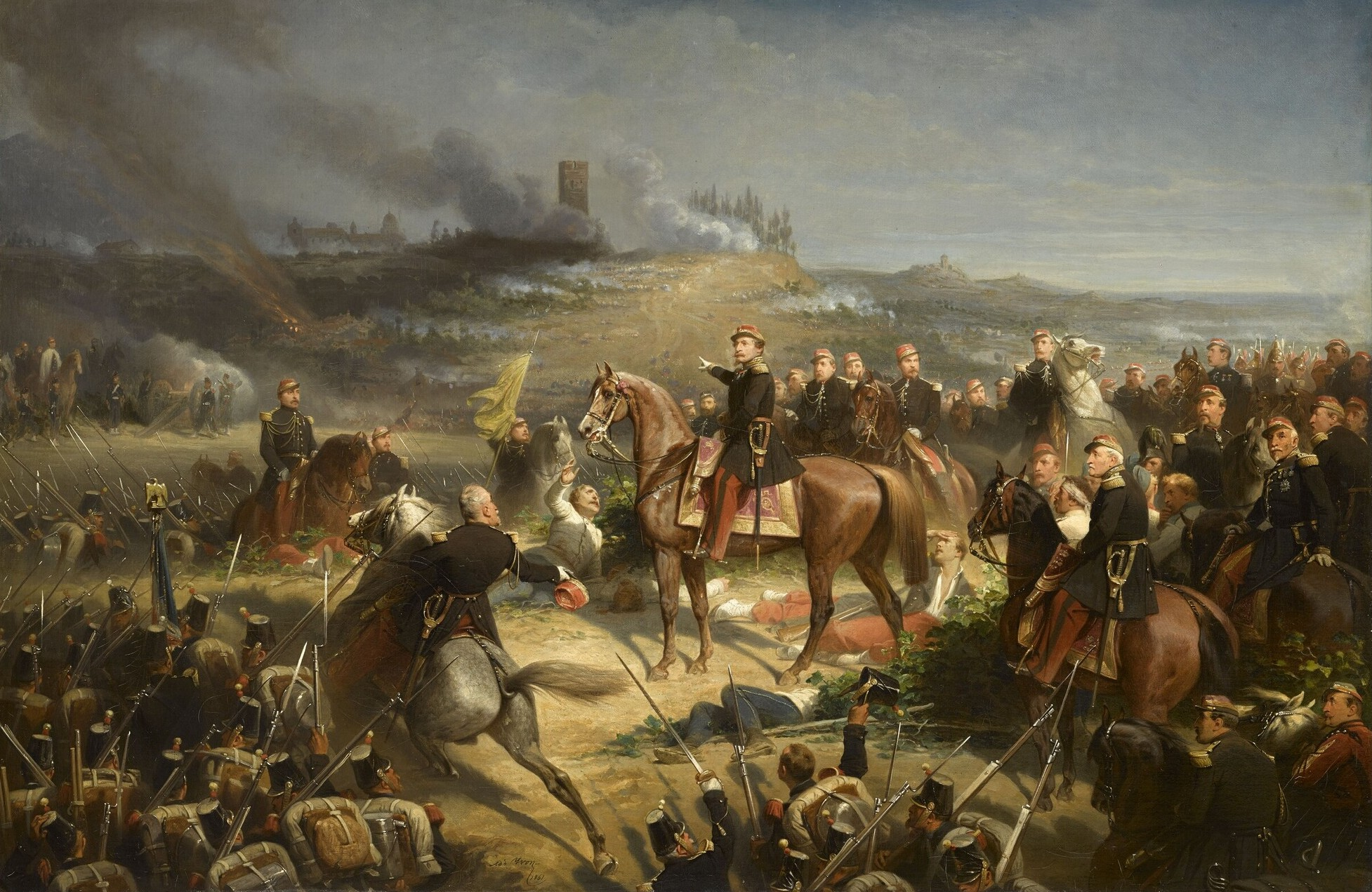
The Battle of Solferino by Adolphe Yvon. Napoleon III with the French forces at the Battle of Solferino, which secured the Austrian withdrawal from Italy

The next war between great powers came just three years later in 1859, with what became known as the Second Italian War of Independence. The war was fought between France and Piedmont-Sardinia on the one hand and Austria on the other and resulted in a swift defeat for the Austrians. Lasting only two months and resulting mainly in the transfer of lands to a minor Italian power (Piedmont Sardinia), the war also did not result in a general European war but the transfer of European territory from a great power was unprecedented during the Concert period and presaged the coming decade of wars of national unity which would reshape Europe.

The decline of the Concert was further highlighted by the failure of a ceasefire in 1864 over the issue of Prussia's and Austria's invasion of Denmark in the Second Schleswig War. As the growth of nationalism led to dissatisfaction with the rule of the Danish crown over ethnically German Holstein and ethnically mixed Schleswig, the German populations of the duchies revolted in 1848 but the threat of intervention by the other major powers prevented the German great powers (Prussia and Austria) from intervening and the First Schleswig War ended in a restoration of the status quo ante. However, by 1863, when a succession crisis caused Denmark to breach the terms of the treaty and attempt to incorporate Schleswig into Denmark, the German powers, Austria and Prussia, responding to national sentiment across the German Confederation and with the excuse that Denmark had violated the existing treaties, both opposed a negotiated settlement. The efforts of the other Powers, primarily Britain, France and Russia at the London Conference of 1864 failed. The collapse of the Concert was further sealed when the war was concluded with a trilateral treaty between Prussia, Austria, and Denmark rather than a larger Congress involving the other Great Powers.

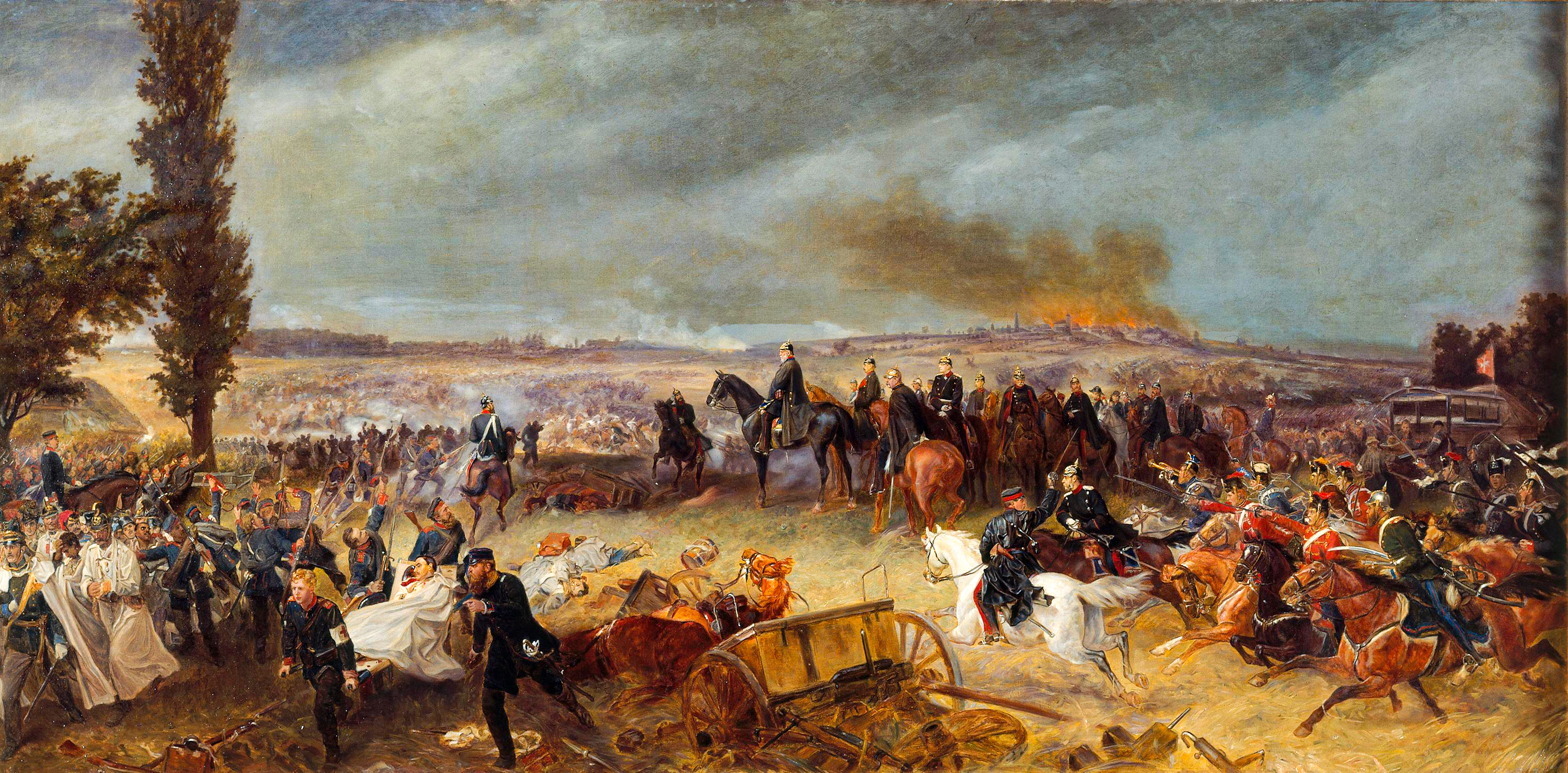
Prussian King Wilhelm I and Otto von Bismarck watching the Battle of Königgrätz, 1866

The Second Schleswig War set the stage for the subsequent wars of German unification (the Austro-Prussian War and the Franco-Prussian War) which did not result in interventions by any other great powers and which resulted in significant changes to the map of Europe. These wars, and the wars of Italian unification were concluded among the participants without the approval of non-participant powers in Congresses or Conferences to maintain the balance of power. While various multilateral conferences took place during this period – most notably, the London Conference of 1867 which forestalled war over the Luxembourg Crisis – the cooperative nature of the Concert and its focus on stability was significantly diminished during this time of conflict.

== Second phase ==
The second phase of the Concert of Europe is typically described as beginning in the 1871 and ending in 1914 with the outbreak of World War I. 1871 is the year in which the German and Italian unifications were completed and also the year of the Treaty of London. The second phase saw a further period of peace between the Great Powers and a revival of the conference system for the resolution of disputes. This period was dominated by issues related to colonialism, particularly the Scramble for Africa. However, a number of factors led to the hardening of alliances into two camps, the Triple Alliance (Germany, Austria-Hungary, and Italy) and the rival Triple Entente (France, Russia, and the United Kingdom), rather than the flexible balance of power system with each Power viewing all others as rivals. In addition, the growth of colonial and imperial power around the world and the decline of the Ottoman Empire in the Balkans and North Africa meant the Concert's goal of territorial and political stability was harder to achieve, eventually leading to the outbreak of war.

This phase later became known (especially in France) as the Belle Époque, the beautiful epoch, as the two world wars and their consequences made the period preceding the First World War seem like a golden age by comparison.

=== Revival of great power conferences ===
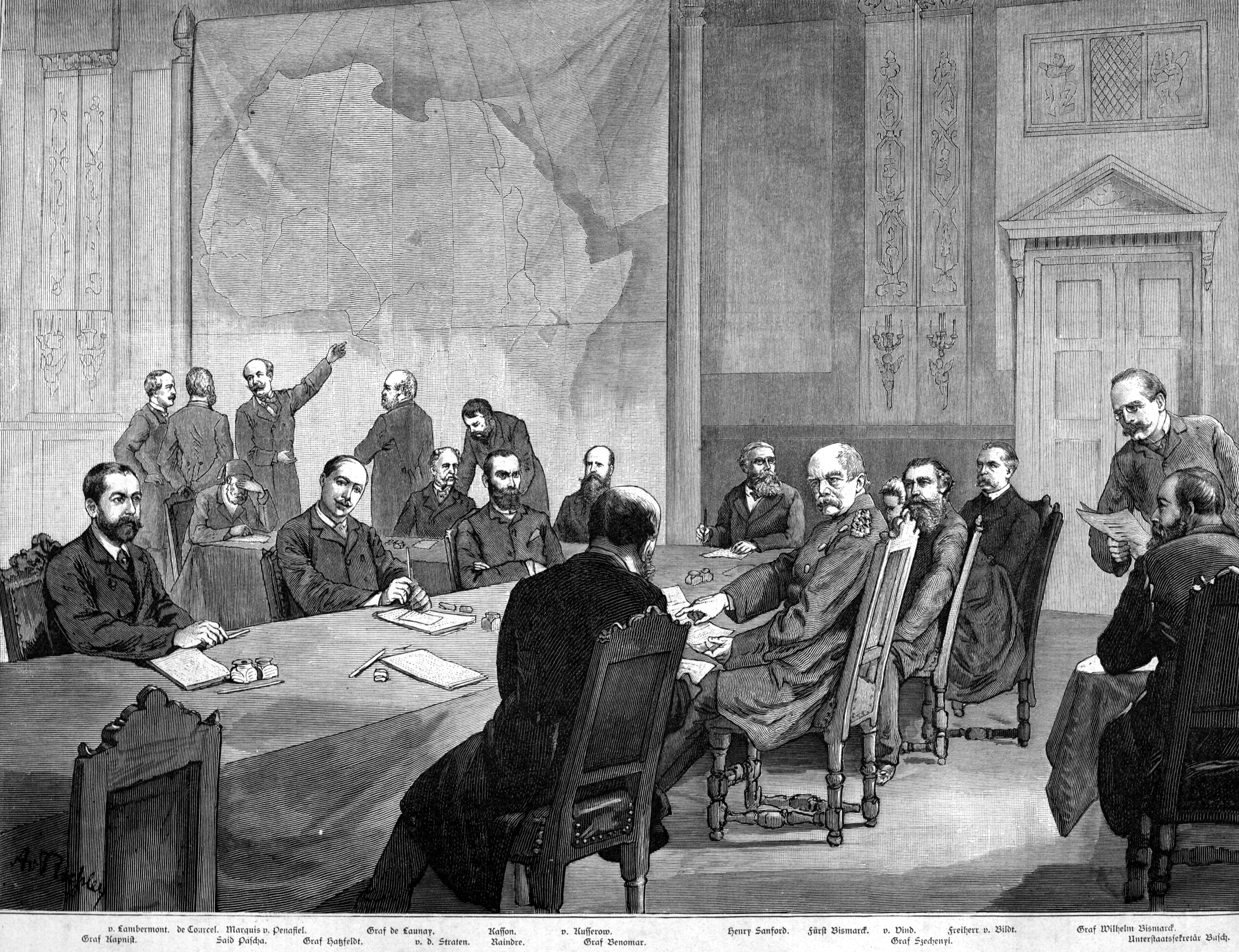
European officials staking claims to Africa in the Berlin Conference, 1884

The second phase saw a revival of great power "conferences" where all the great powers met on an ad hoc basis to resolve crises or disputes by consensus. At the Congress of Berlin following the Russo-Turkish War of 1877–78, despite Russia's clear victory on the battlefield and separate peace treaty signed with the Ottomans, the other Great Powers demanded concessions from the Russians and redrew the map of the Balkans based on a broad agreement rather than the terms Russia had imposed militarily. The Berlin Conference of 1884–1885 is often seen as the high point of the second phase, as all great powers and several minor powers agreed on the rules for colonial expansion which defined areas of colonial and imperial control and successfully preempted many disputes concerning colonial expansion in Africa. All the European Great Powers also participated in the suppression of the Boxer Rebellion (1899-1901) in China (alongside the United States and Japan), to affirm and defend the unequal treaties signed between China and Western powers in the preceding decades. Two major international conferences at the Hague led to the Hague Conventions of 1899 and 1907 and illustrated the continuing desire for peace and stability within Europe. While these do reveal a continuation of the norm of grand Conferences to preserve the status quo, the Conventions were largely ignored in the First World War, many proposals were vetoed or not adopted by all Great Powers, and non-European and minor Powers played an important role.

=== Decline of the second phase ===
Rival military coalitions in 1914: Triple Entente Triple Alliance

The fall of the second phase of the Concert of Europe can be attributed largely to the rival alliance systems – the Triple Alliance (Germany, Austria-Hungary, and Italy) and the Triple Entente (France, Russia, and the United Kingdom) – which formed a rift in the European States. These rival alliances threatened the underlying nature of the Concert, which relied on ad hoc alliances to respond to a given situation. Later conferences including the Algeciras Conference of 1906 defusing the First Moroccan Crisis, showed that the Conference System was still viable for resolving disputes, but further cemented the adversarial relationship between the two camps.

Furthermore, events in the Balkans undermined the Concert as the great powers were not able to preserve the status quo after the First Balkan War. While the London Conference of 1912–1913 called on the great powers to finalize the borders, the success of the minor Balkan states was presented to the great powers as a fait accompli and could not be undone. The crisis of July 1914 – the assassination of Archduke Franz Ferdinand in Sarajevo which lit the fuse on Balkan tensions – catalyzed the collapse of the Concert of Europe for good, and marked the start of the first World War.

=== Role of nationalism ===
Nationalism played a role in the fall of both the first and second phases of the Concert of Europe, and was generally on the rise around the world before the start of the first World War; nationalism is seen by some scholars as a driving factor in the start of the first World War. Particularly with the fall of the first phase, the rise of nationalism was in almost direct opposition to the core cooperative functions of the Concert, and resulted in States who were no longer well constrained by the Congress system. The outbreak of conflict – namely in the Balkans after the assassination of Archduke Franz Ferdinand – highlighted the final failure of the Concert of Europe, in that it was no longer able to constrain State national interests in order to maintain a cooperative international front.

== See also ==
- Hague Conventions of 1899 and 1907
- Eastern Question
- Great power
- International relations (1814–1919)
- Multipolarity
- Precedence among European monarchies
