= The Entry of Emperor Francis I into Vienna After the Peace of Paris =

Painting by Johann Peter Krafft

The Entry of Emperor Francis I into Vienna after the Peace of Paris
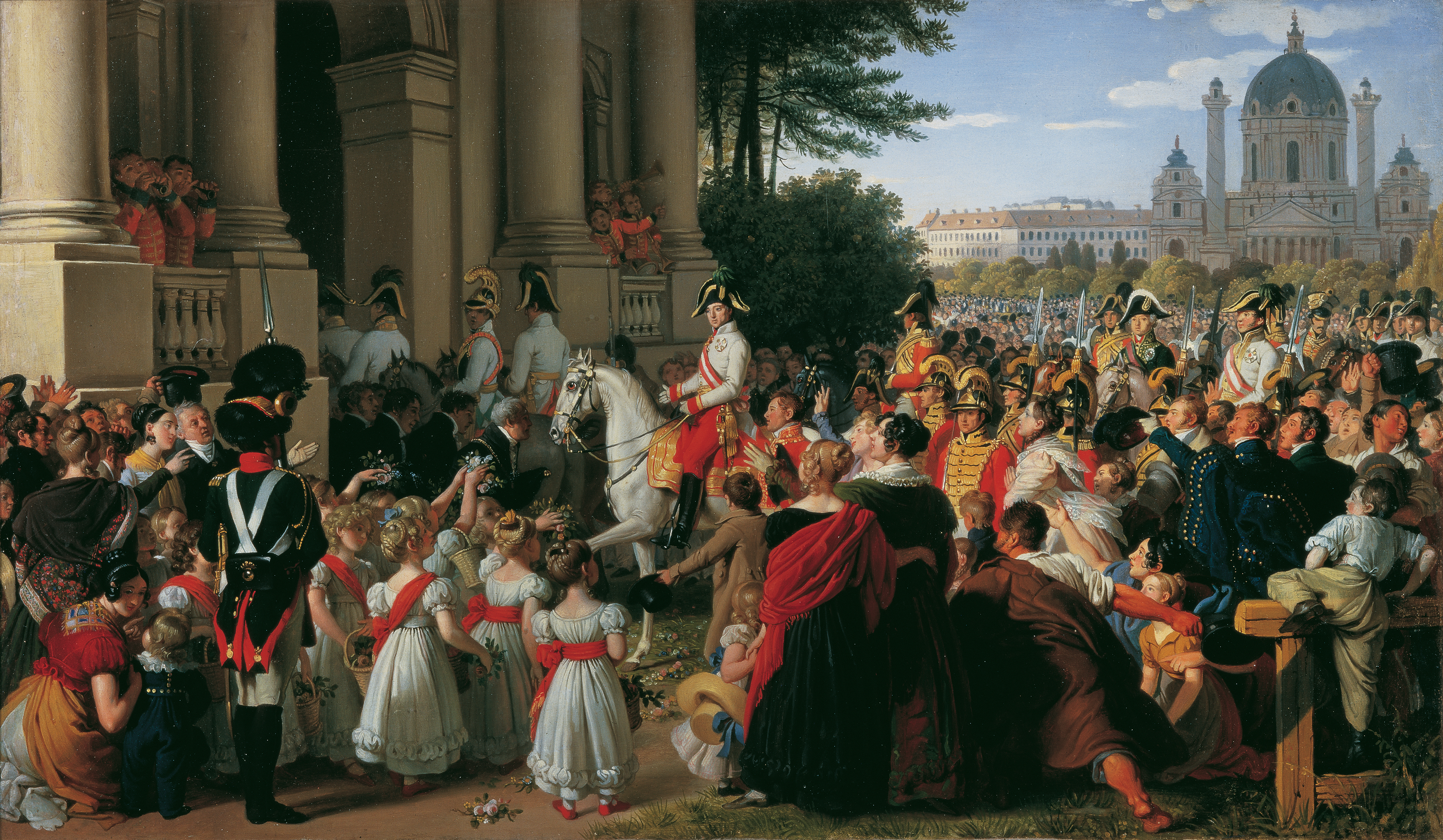
- Artist: Johann Peter Krafft
- Year: 1828
- Type: Oil on canvas, history painting
- Dimensions: 38 cm × 65 cm (15 in × 26 in)
- Location: Belvedere Museum; Vienna

The Entry of Emperor Francis I into Vienna After the Peace of Paris (German: Der Einzug von Kaiser Franz I. in Wien nach dem Pariser Frieden am 16. Juni 1814) is an oil on canvas history painting by the German-born Austrian artist Johann Peter Krafft, from 1828.

== History and description ==
It depicts the Austrian Emperor Francis I returning to his capital city Vienna on 16 June 1814 at the victorious conclusion of the War of the Sixth Coalition. Austria and its allies had recently signed the Treaty of Paris following the abdication of Napoleon.

Francis is seen receiving a ceremonial welcome back to the capital from the Mayor of Vienna and other dignitaries. The city would host the diplomatic Congress of Vienna, interrupted by Napoleon's escape and defeat during the Hundred Days campaign. Today the painting is in the collection of the Belvedere Museum in Vienna.

Krafft, a former pupil of Jacques-Louis David, produced a number of works commemorating Austrian participation in the Napoleonic Wars including The Departure of the Militiaman (1813) and The Battle of Aspern-Essling (1820).

== Bibliography ==
- Crow, Thomas. Restoration: The Fall of Napoleon in the Course of European Art, 1812-1820. Princeton University Press, 2023.
- Frodl-Schneemann, Marianne. Johann Peter Krafft, 1780–1856: Monographie und Verzeichnis der Gemälde. Herold, 1984.
