= The Departure of the Militiaman =

Painting by Johann Peter Krafft

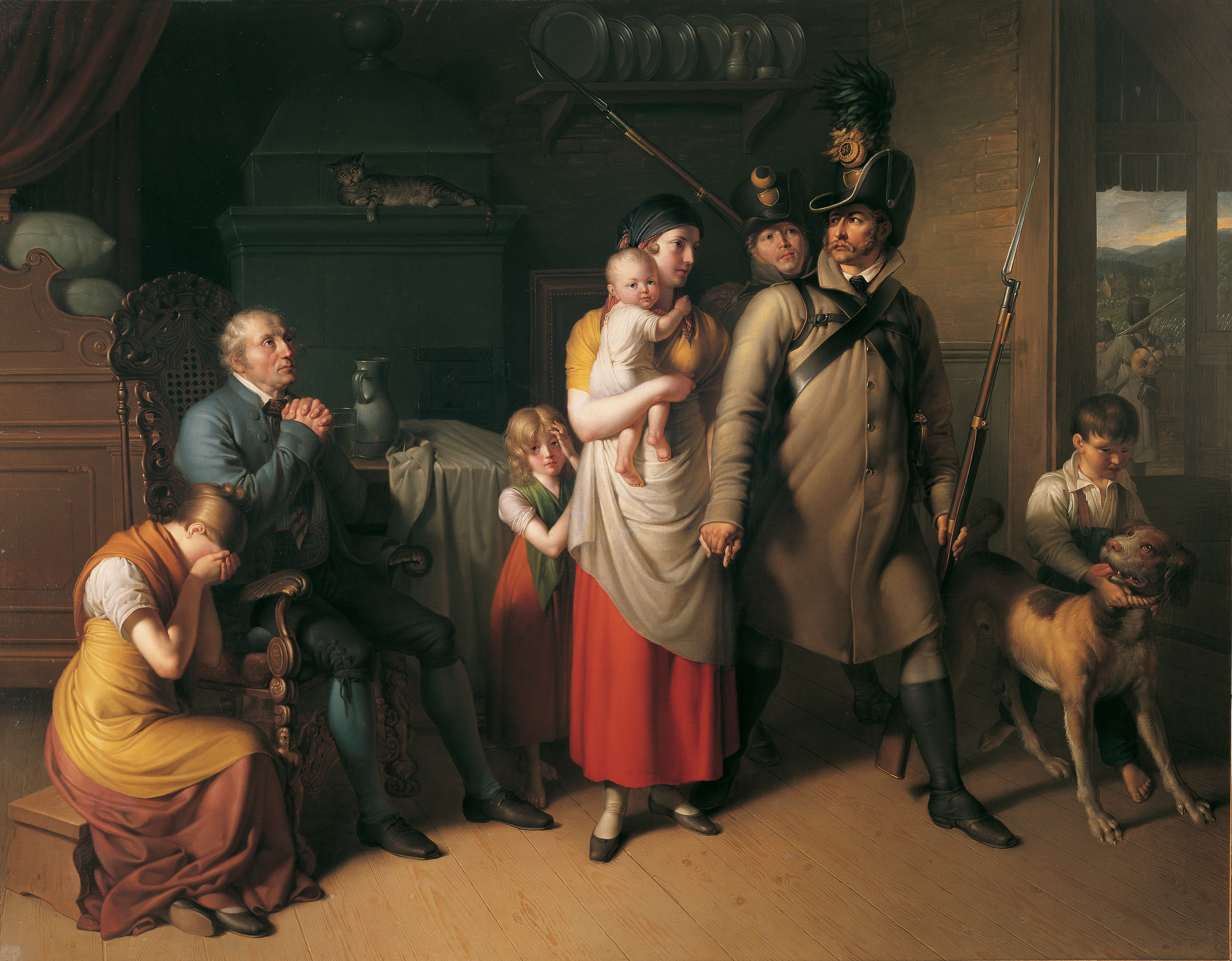
- Artist: Johann Peter Krafft
- Year: 1813
- Type: Oil on canvas, history painting
- Dimensions: 351 cm × 281 cm (138 in × 111 in)
- Location: Österreichische Galerie Belvedere, Vienna

The Departure of the Militiaman (German: Der Abschied des Landwehrmannes) is an oil on canvas painting by the German-Austrian artist Johann Peter Krafft, from 1813. It is held at the Österreichische Galerie Belvedere, in Vienna.

== History and description ==
It depicts a scene from the German campaign of 1813 during the Napoleonic Wars. In a farmhouse room a departing member of the Imperial-Royal Landwehr bids farewell to his family as he departs to fight the French-led armies of Napoleon. He holds his wife's hands one last time, as she holds their child on her lap. Two more children are visible, a girl, behind her mother, and a boy, at the right, with his dog. His father holds his hands, seemingly in a prayer, as he looks up. A younger relative, at the left, probably his sister, can`t hide her tears.

In 1816 it was acquired for the collection of the Austrian Emperor Francis I. The work is in the Belvedere in Vienna.

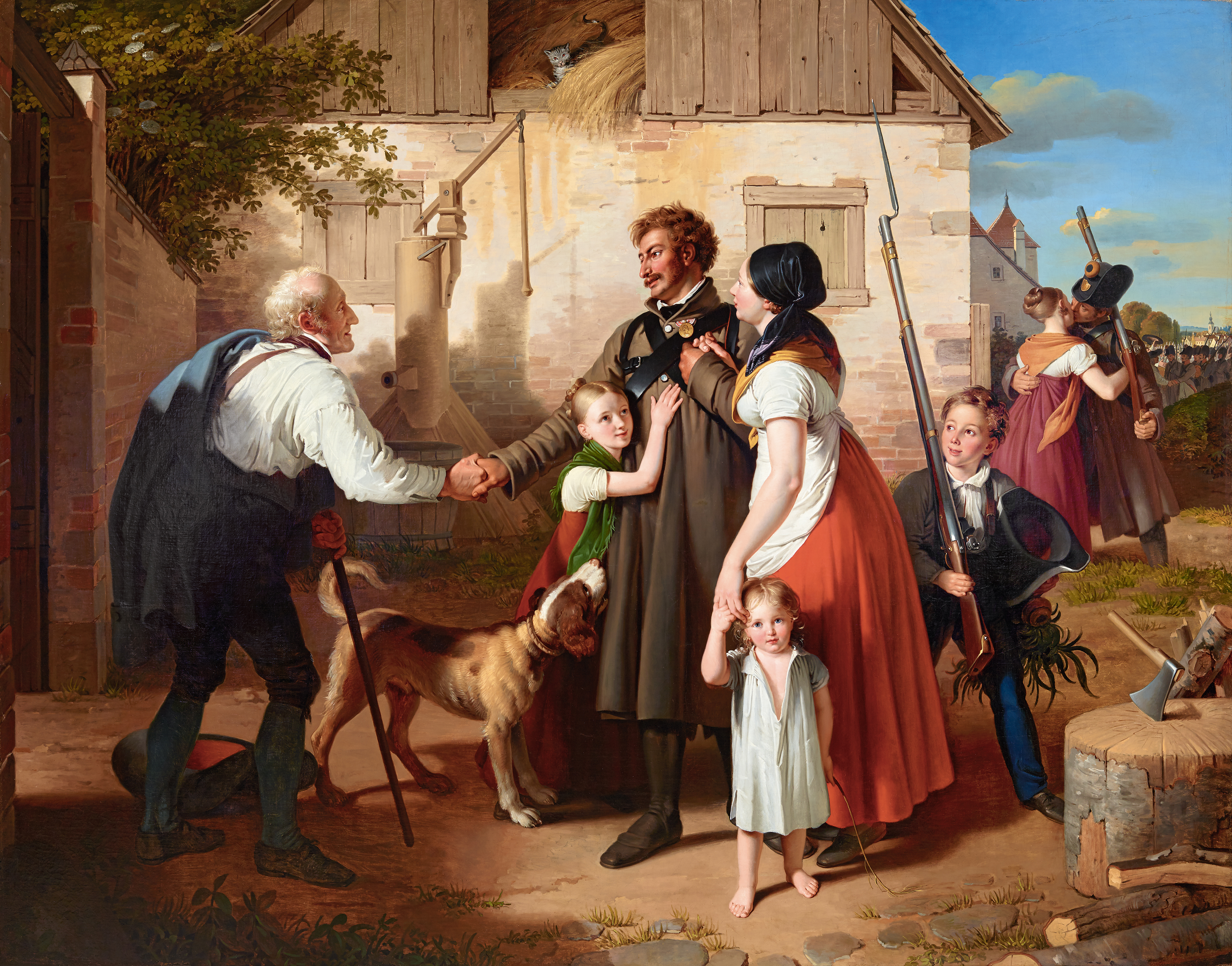
Die Heimkehr des Landwehrmannes, 1820

Krafft produced a sequel Die Heimkehr des Landwehrmannes in 1820 which is also in the Belvedere. This depicts the returning Landwehr some time later following the allied victory. In contrast to the dark interior of the first painting, the follow-up is in the bright sunlit day.

== Bibliography ==
- Drescher, Seymour (ed.) Political Symbolism in Modern Europe. Routledge, 2020.
- Frodl-Schneemann, Marianne. Johann Peter Krafft, 1780-1856: Monographie und Verzeichnis der Gemälde. Herold, 1984.
- Rollig, Stella & Huemer, Christian. Das Belvedere. 300 Jahre Ort der Kunst. Walter de Gruyter, 2023.
- Telesko, Werner. Kulturraum Österreich: die Identität der Regionen in der bildenden Kunst des 19. Jahrhunderts, Volume 2. Böhlau Verlag Wien, 2008.
