= The Battle of Aspern-Essling =

Painting by Johann Peter Krafft

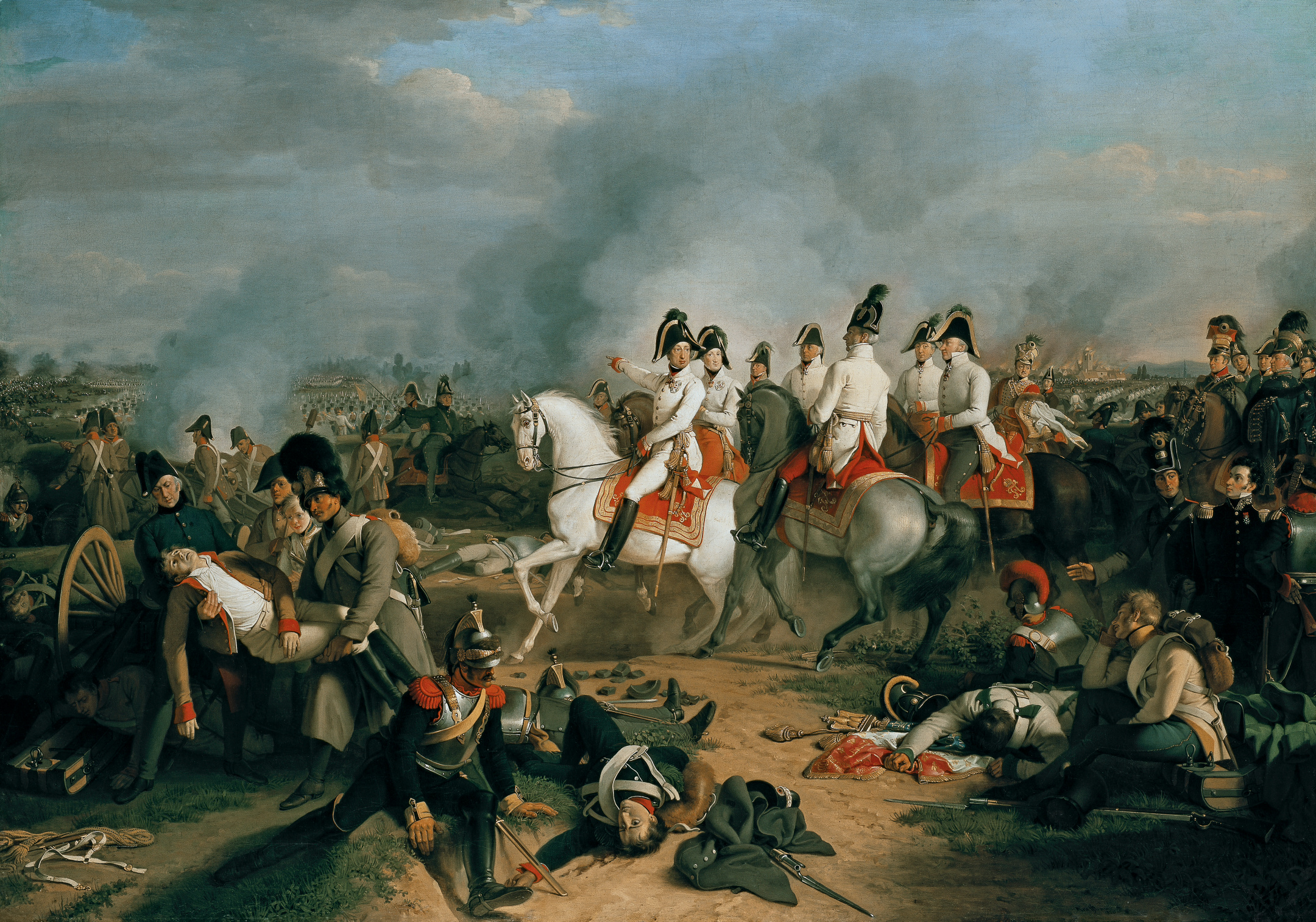
- 1820 version
- Artist: Johann Peter Krafft
- Year: 1820
- Medium: Oil on canvas
- Dimensions: 192 cm × 268 cm (76 in × 106 in)
- Location: Liechtenstein Museum, Vienna

The Battle of Aspern-Essling is an 1820 history painting by the German-Austrian artist Johann Peter Krafft. It portrays the Battle of Aspern-Essling fought on 21–22 May 1809 during the Napoleonic Wars. Fought just after Napoleon's forces had captured the Austrian capital Vienna, it was a significant defeat for the Grande Armée at the hands of the Austrian Army led by Archduke Charles. It is also known by the longer title Archduke Charles, Duke of Teschen, with his Staff at the Battle of Aspern-Essling.

In 1821 it was purchased by the Prince of Liechtenstein, who had fought at the battle. In 1838 Krafft produced another version of the painting, which is now also in the Liechtenstein Collection.

== See also ==
- The Battle of Wagram, an 1836 painting of Horace Vernet depicting another battle from the same campaign

== Bibliography ==
- Bryan, Michael. Dictionary of Painters and Engravers. G. Bell & Sons, 1898.
- Frodl-Schneemann, Marianne. Johann Peter Krafft, 1780–1856: Monographie und Verzeichnis der Gemälde. Herold, 1984.
- Kräftner, Johann. Liechtenstein Museum: Classicism and Biedermeier. Liechtenstein Museum, 2004.
