= The Declaration of Victory After the Battle of Leipzig =

Painting by Johann Peter Krafft

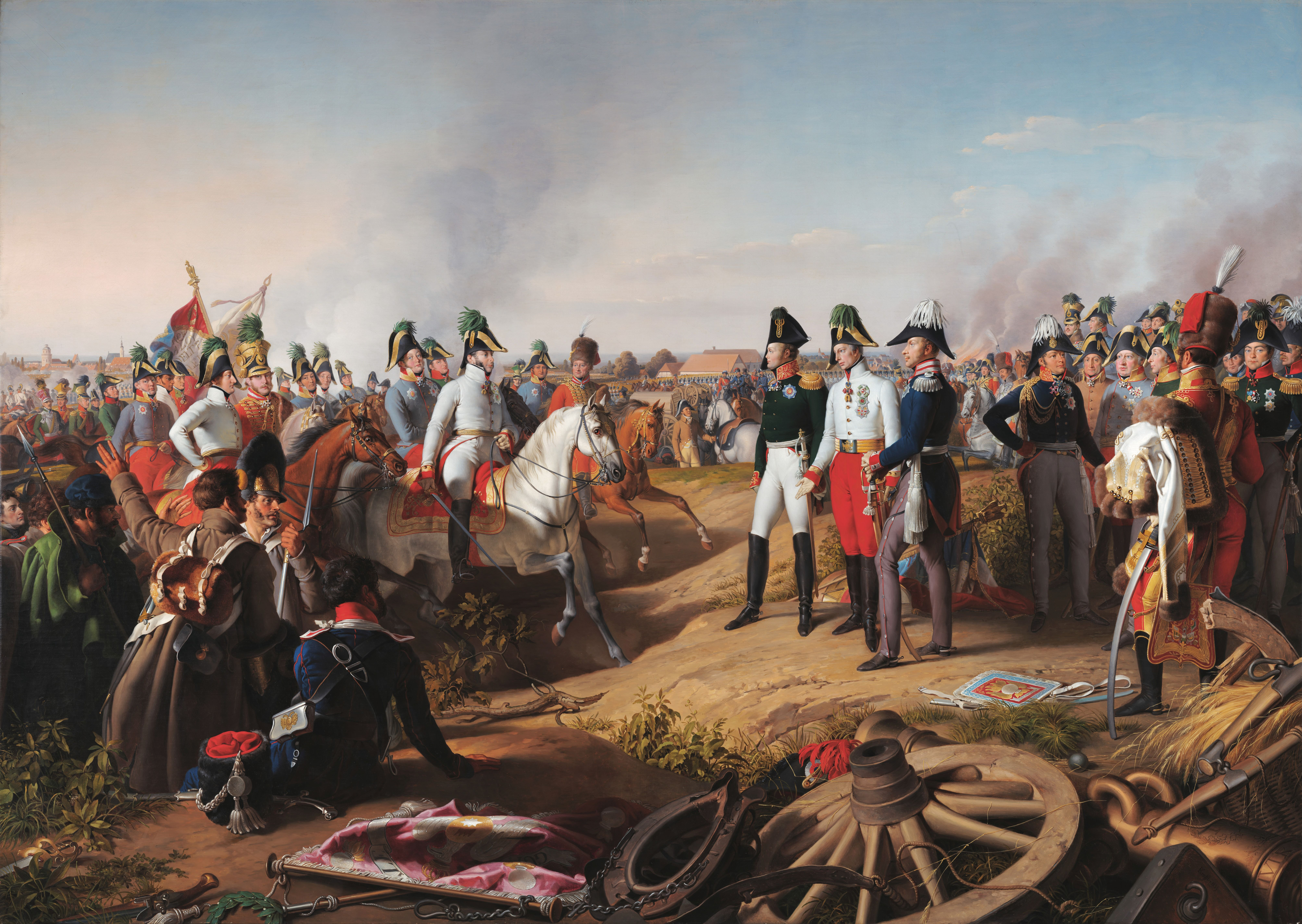
- Artist: Johann Peter Krafft
- Year: 1839
- Type: Oil on canvas, history painting
- Dimensions: 192 cm × 268 cm (76 in × 106 in)
- Location: German Historical Museum, Berlin

The Declaration of Victory After the Battle of Leipzig (German: Siegesmeldung nach der Schlacht bei Leipzig) is an 1839 history painting by the German artist Johann Peter Krafft. It depicts the scene on 19 October 1813 following the four-day Battle of Leipzig when the allied victory over Napoleon's French Empire is reported by Karl Philipp, Prince of Schwarzenberg.

The battle was the largest fought during the Napoleonic Wars. Prominent in the centre are three of the "Allied Monarchs" of the Sixth Coalition, Alexander I of Russia, Francis I of Austria and Frederick William III of Prussia. It was commissioned by the Austrians, and the majority of those pictured are Austrian. The painting is in the collection of the German Historical Museum in Berlin.

== Bibliography ==
- Frodl-Schneemann, Marianne. Johann Peter Krafft, 1780-1856: Monographie und Verzeichnis der Gemälde. Herold, 1984.
- Riley, Jonathon. 1813: Empire at Bay: The Sixth Coalition & the Downfall of Napoleon. Grub Street Publishers, 2013.
- Wagar, Chip. Double Emperor: The Life and Times of Francis of Austria. Rowman & Littlefield, 2018.
