= Johann Peter Krafft =

German-born Austrian painter

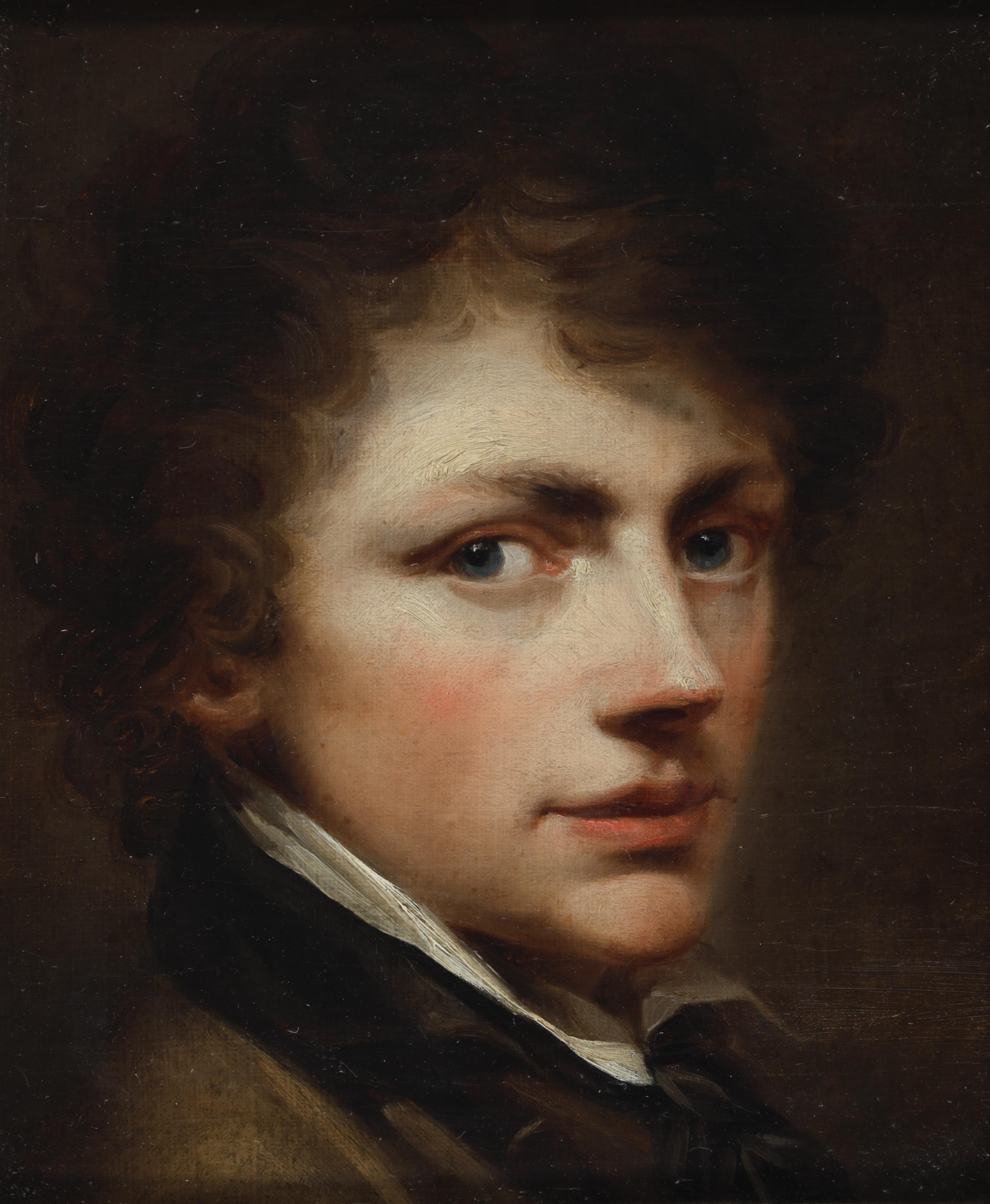
- Self-portrait, c. 1799
- Born: 15 September 1780; Hanau, Hesse, Germany
- Died: 28 October 1856 (aged 76); Vienna, Austria
- Resting place: Vienna Central Cemetery
- Known for: Painting
- Movement: Romanticism
- Spouse: Juliana Preisinger (m. 1815)

Johann Peter Krafft (15 September 1780 – 28 October 1856) was a German-born Austrian painter, who specialized in portraits, historical works, and genre scenes.

== Early life and education ==
He was born in Hanau. His father was an enamel painter who originally came from a family of wine merchants in Alsace. His brother, Joseph Krafft (1786–1828), also became a painter of portrait miniatures. By the age of ten, Krafft was already attending a drawing school.

In 1799, he and sister were sent to live with an aunt in Vienna, where he immediately enrolled at the Academy of Fine Arts, where he studied history painting with Heinrich Friedrich Füger.

In 1802, he travelled to Paris with Veit Hanns Schnorr von Carolsfeld to continue his studies. There, he made the acquaintance of Jacques-Louis David and François Gérard, who had a major influence on his style.

== Career ==
Krafft returned to Vienna in 1805, where he established himself as a portrait painter. From 1808 to 1809, he went on a study trip through Italy and became a member of the Academy in 1813. Two years later, he married Juliana Preisinger, and three of their children became painters: Marie (1812–1885), Albrecht (1816–1847) and Julie (1821–1903). He was appointed a Professor at the Academy in 1823.

In 1828, he was named Director of the Galerie Belvedere, a position he held until his death. He became an Academic Counselor in 1835. Over the next few years, he travelled to Munich, Dresden and Venice, where he purchased 80 works for the museum. He was also employed as an expert on the preservation of monuments, working at Karlstein Castle, Schönbrunn Palace and the Jesuit Church.

== Death and legacy ==
Krafft died on 20 October 1856 in Vienna and was buried at the Vienna Central Cemetery. In 1885, a street in the Leopoldstadt district of the city was named after him.

== Selected paintings ==
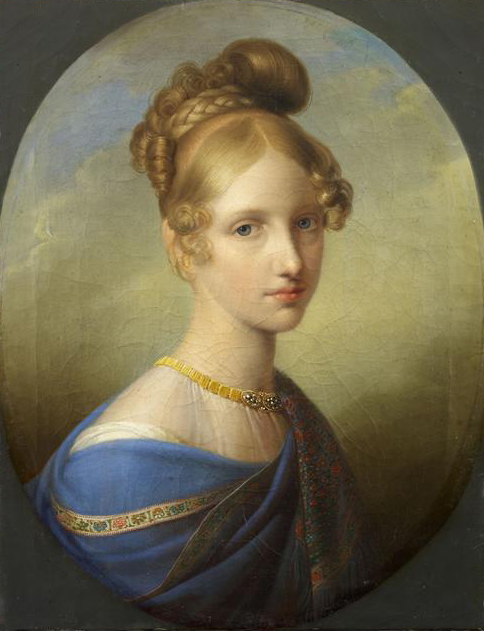
Archduchess Clementina of Austria

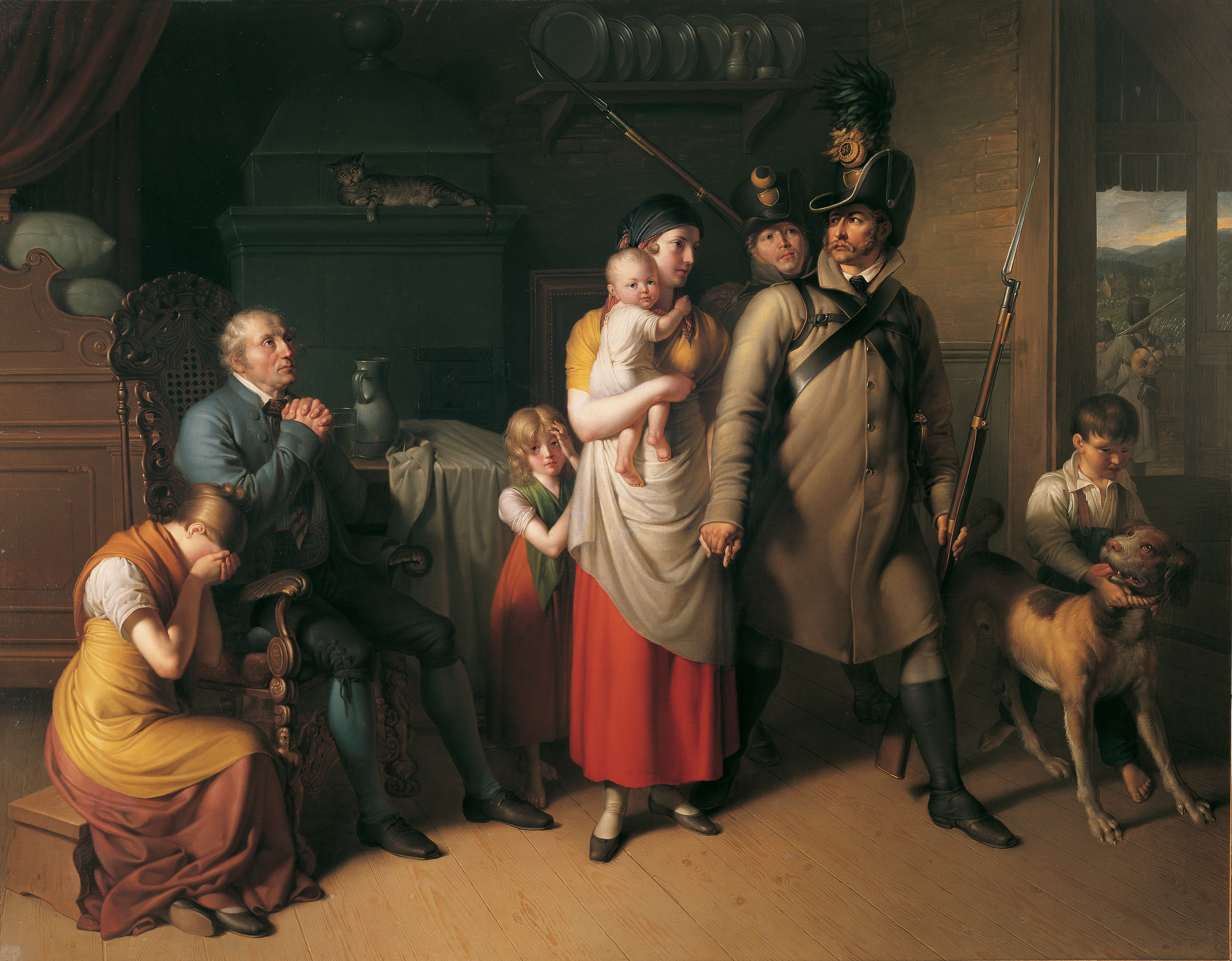
The Departure of the Militiaman, 1813

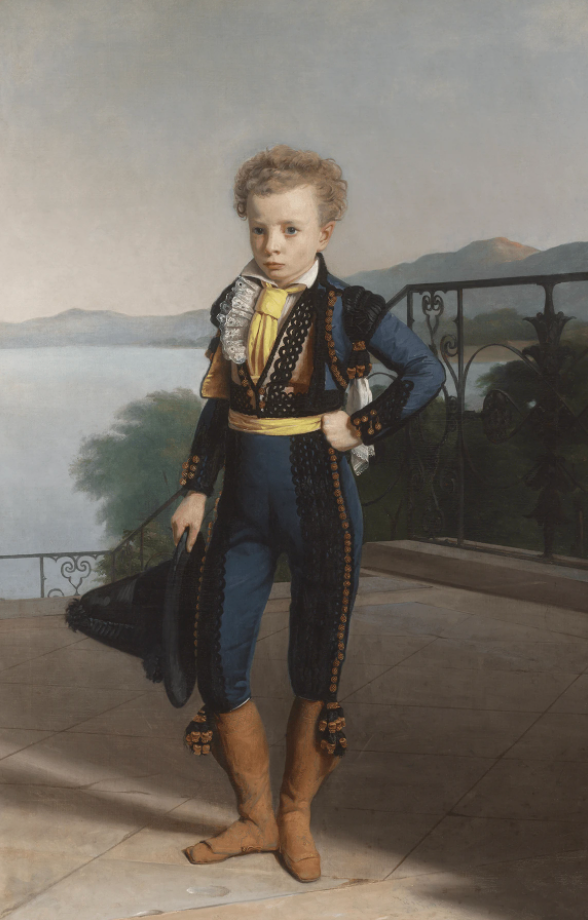
Portrait of Napoléon II, 1818, private collection

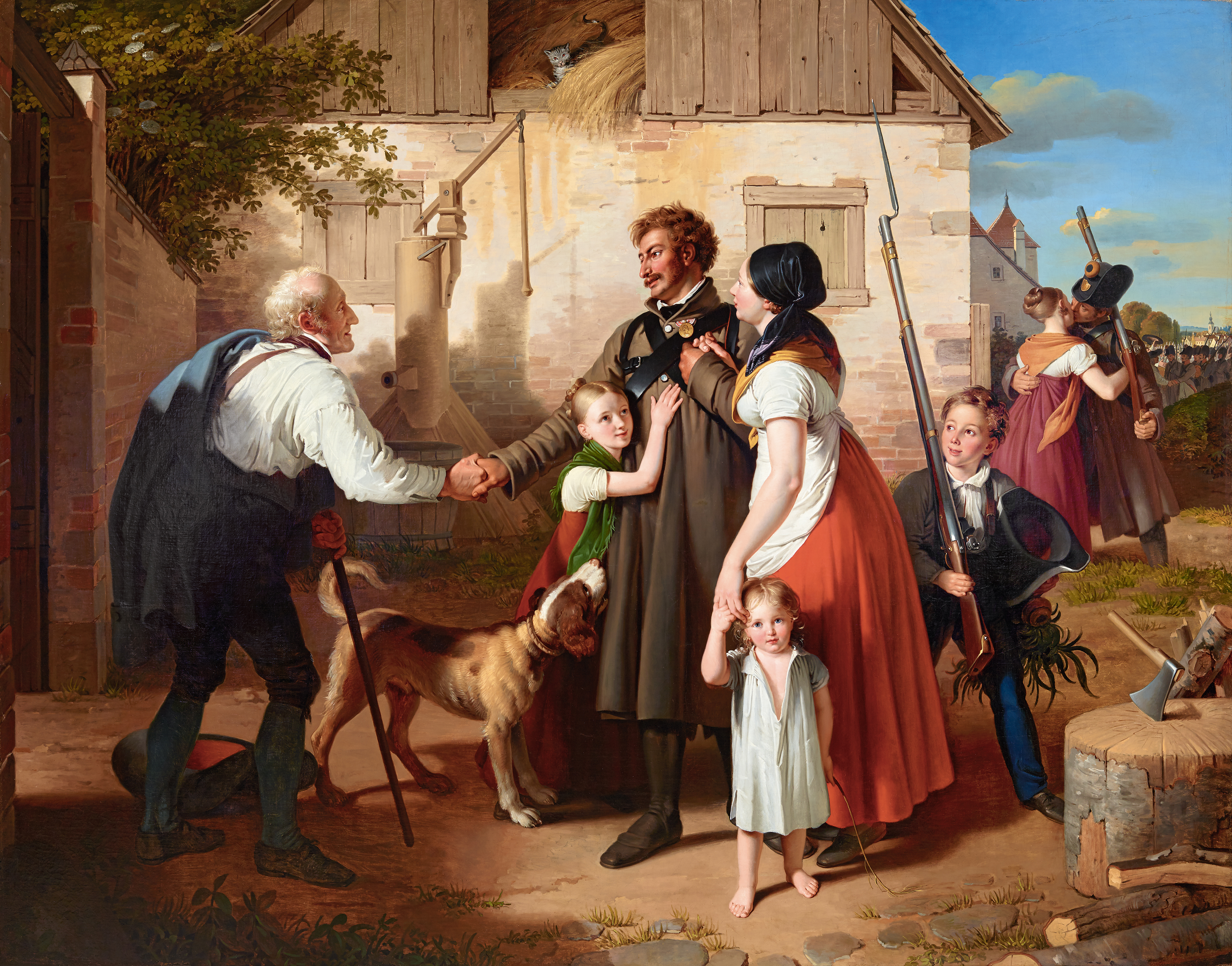
The Homecoming of the Militiaman, 1820

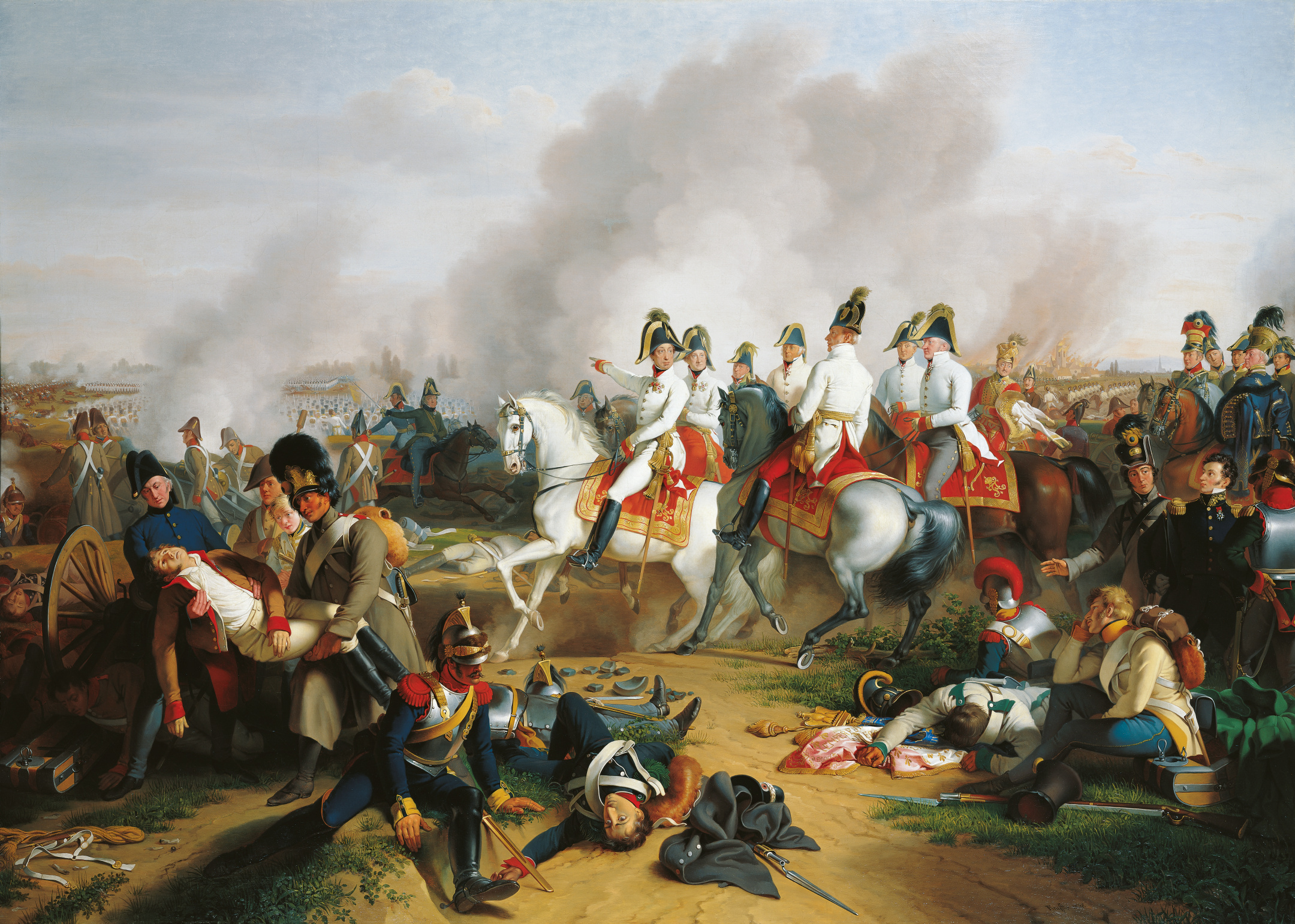
The Battle of Aspern-Essling, 1820

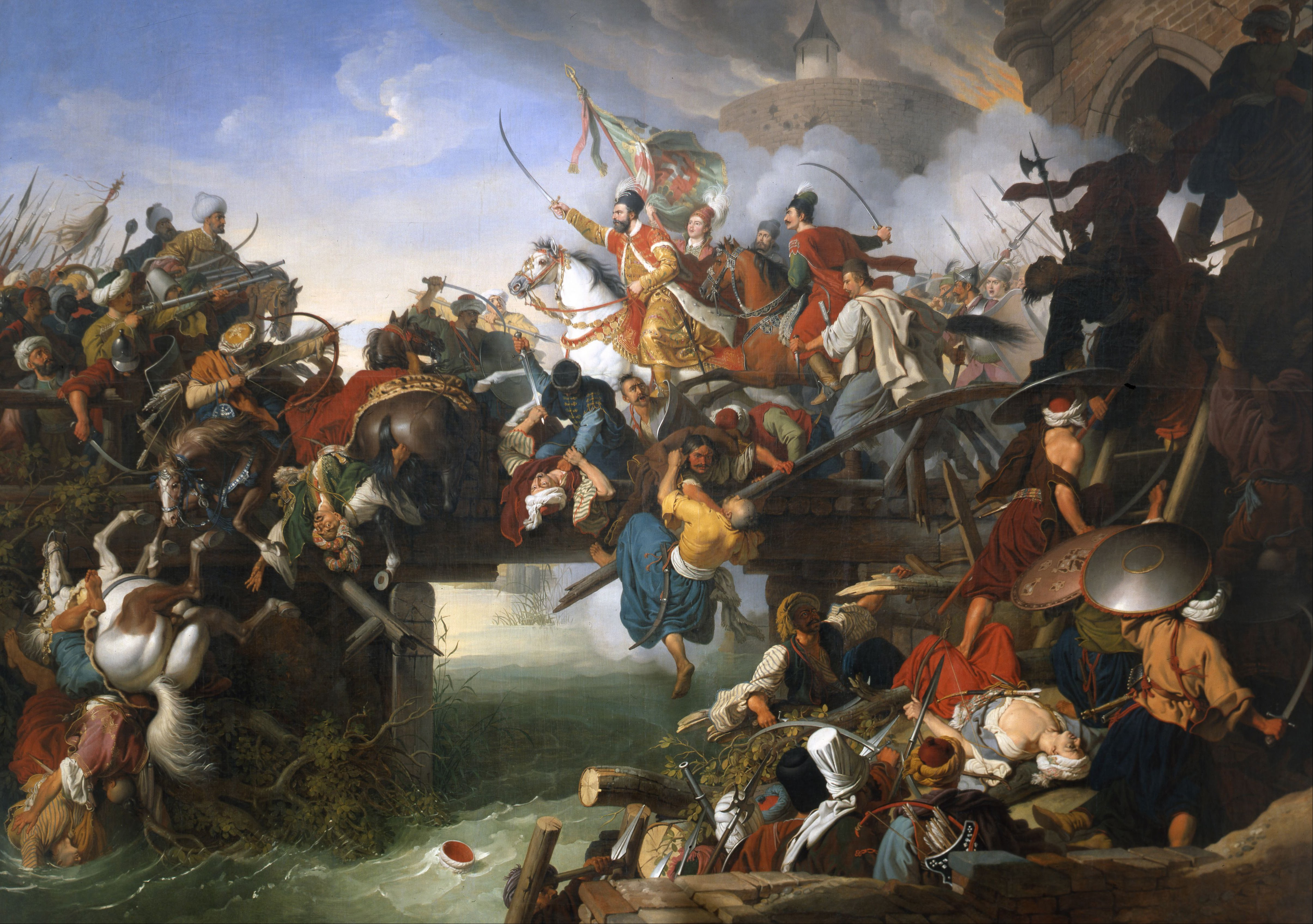
The Siege of Szigetvár, 1825

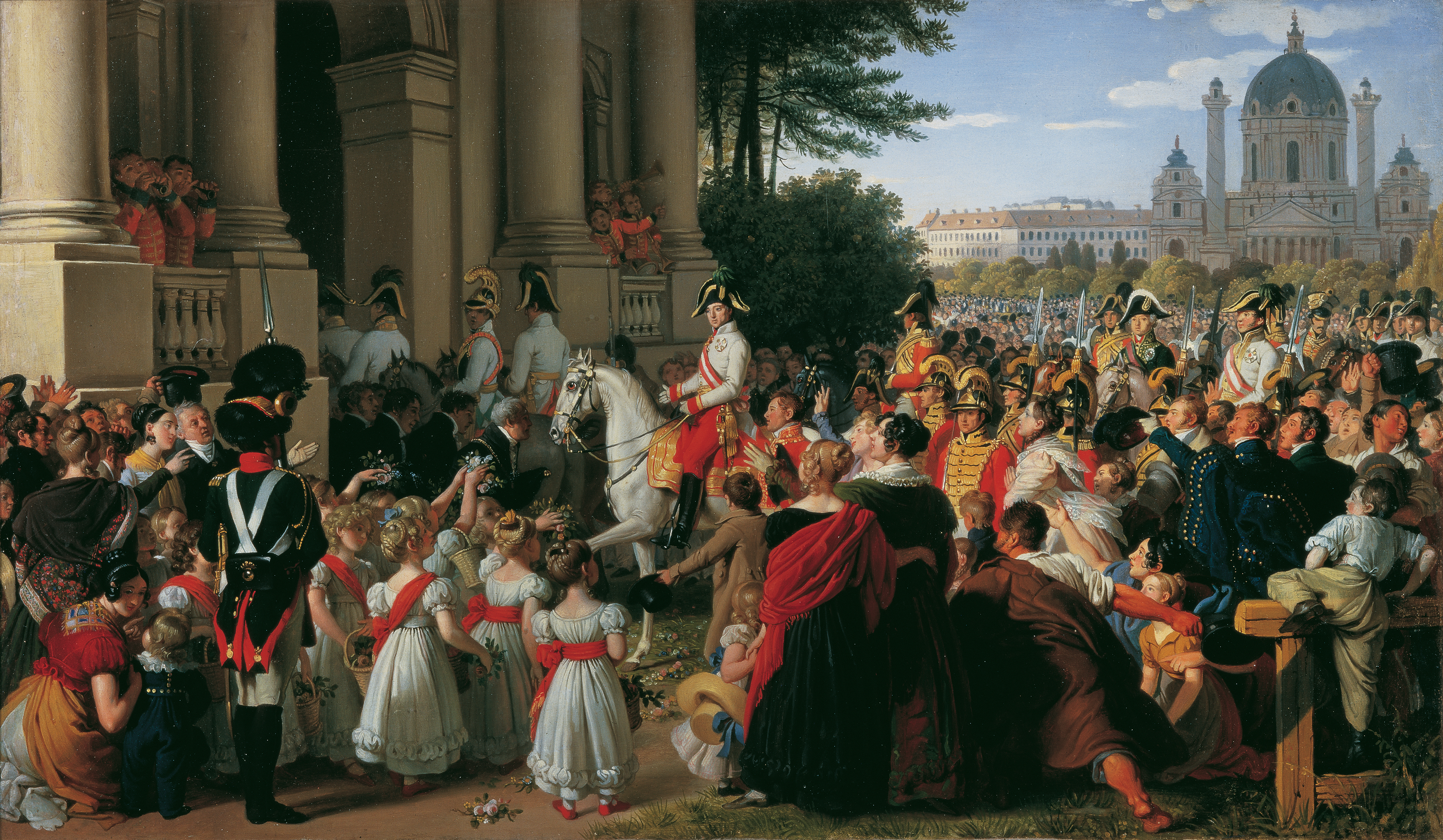
The Entry of Emperor Francis I into Vienna After the Peace of Paris, 1828

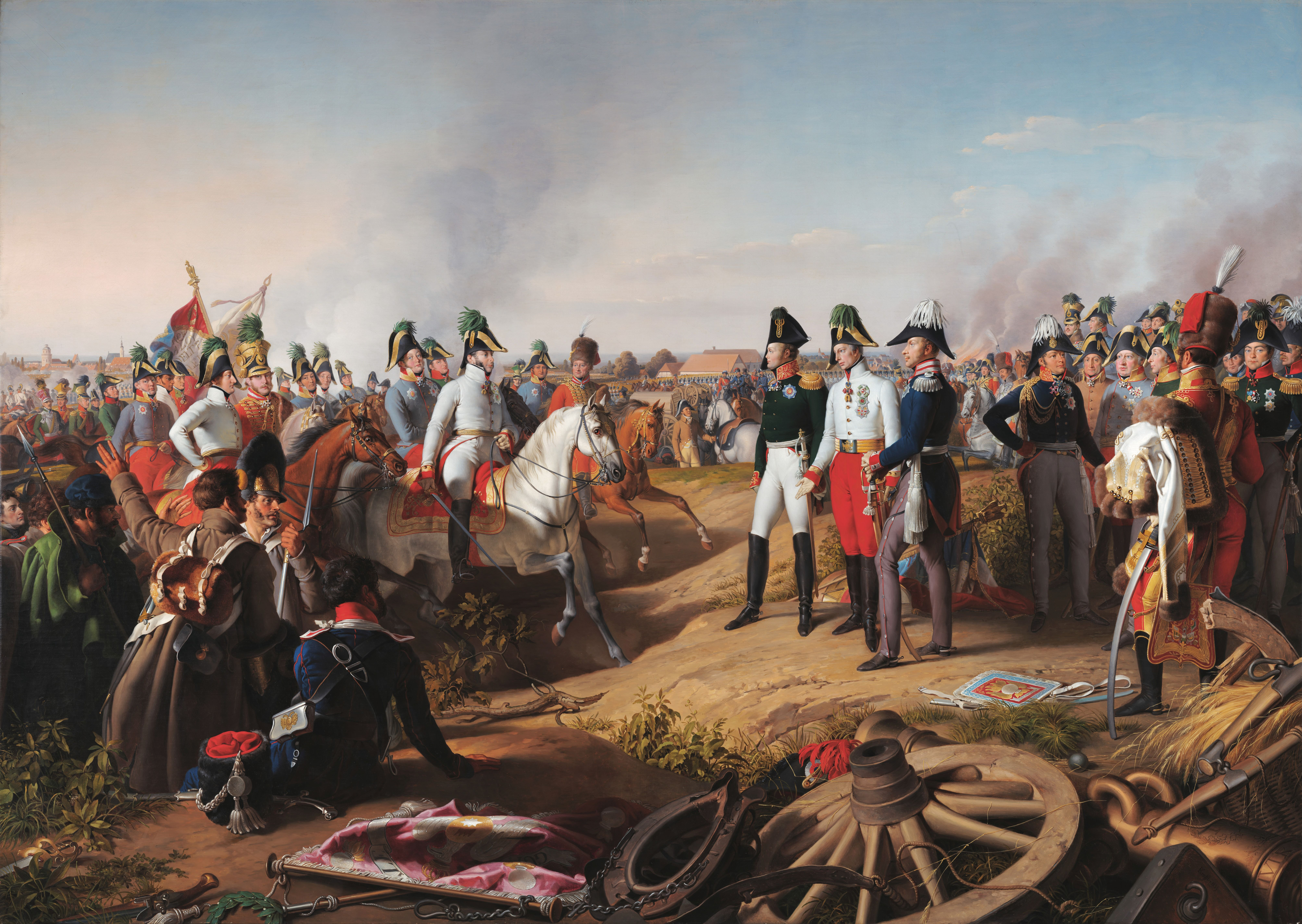
The Declaration of Victory After the Battle of Leipzig, 1839

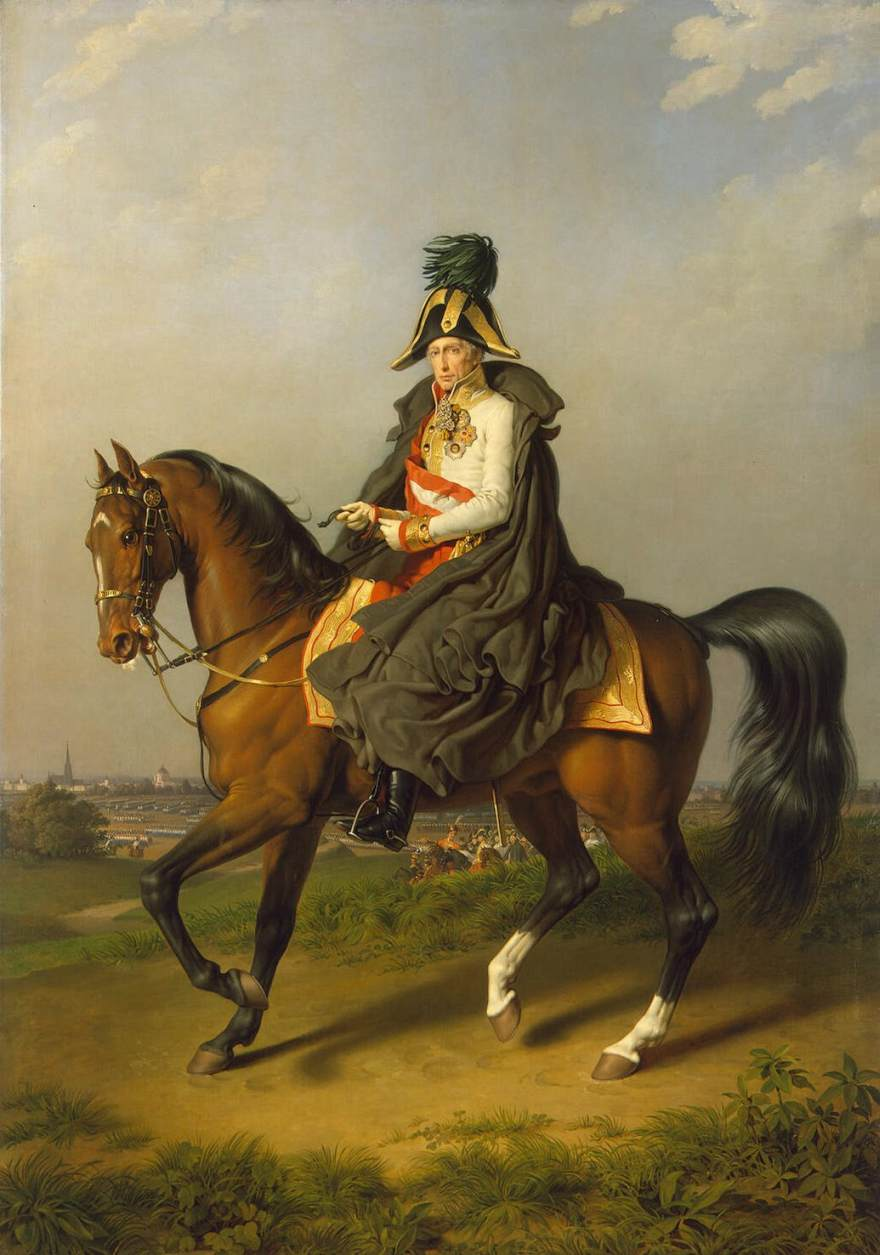
Equestrian portrait of Franz I
