= Battle of Eylau =

1807 battle of the War of the Fourth Coalition

- Part of the War of the Fourth Coalition
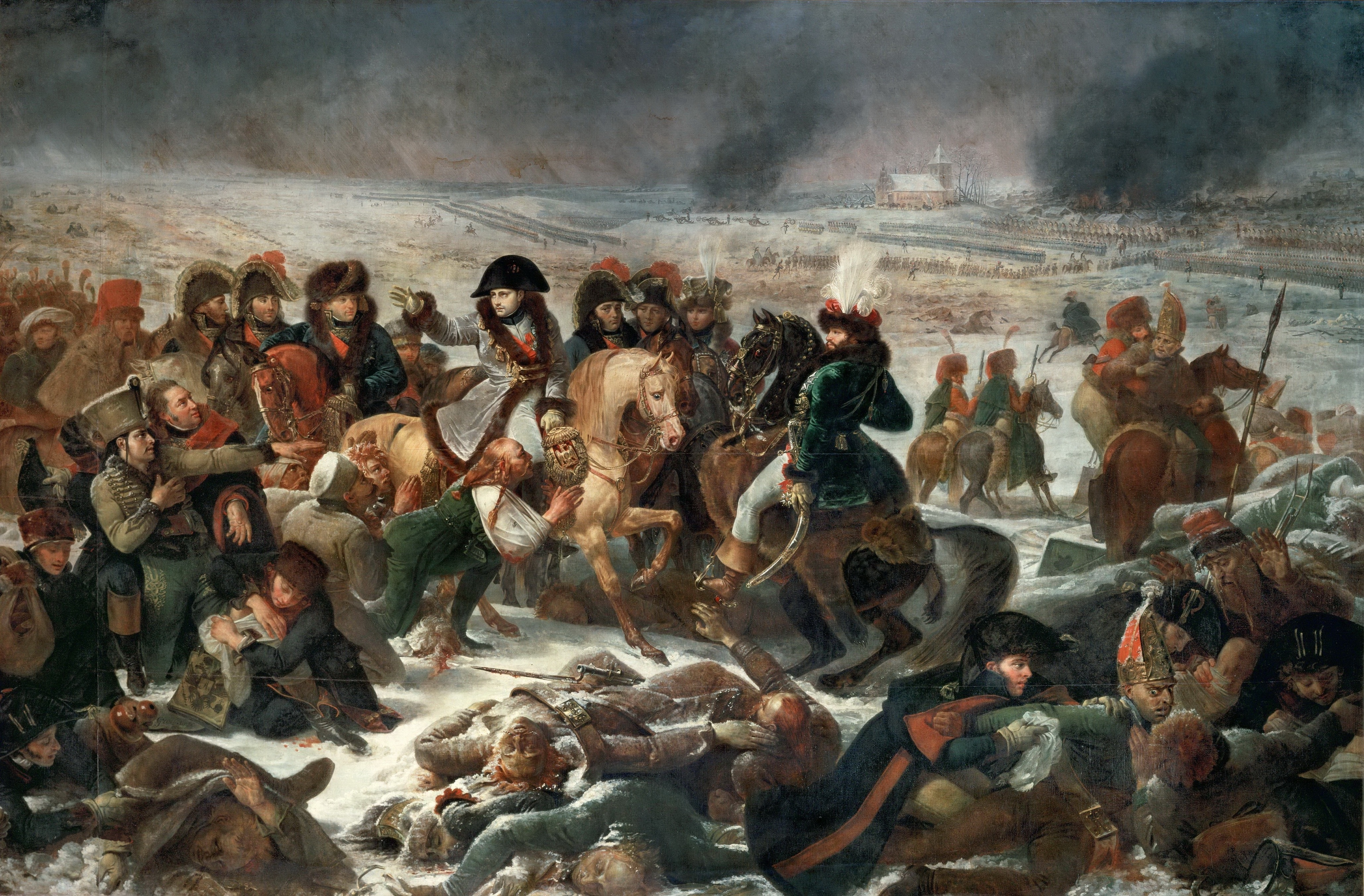
- Napoleon on the Battlefield of Eylau; Antoine-Jean Gros, 1808
Date	7–8 February 1807
Location	Preussisch Eylau, East Prussia (today Bagrationovsk, Russia) (Note: This was administered by Poland as Iławka between 1945 and 1946. It is now in the Russian Kaliningrad Oblast and was renamed Bagrationovsk in 1946, after the Russian general who commanded part of the Russian army.) 54°24′N 20°38′E
Result	Imperial French Victory

Belligerents
French Empire	Russian Empire; Kingdom of Prussia

Commanders and leaders
(First French Empire) Napoleon Bonaparte (First French Empire) Charles-Pierre Augereau (WIA) (First French Empire) Louis-Alexandre Berthier (First French Empire) Jean-Baptiste Bessières (First French Empire) Louis-Nicolas Davout (First French Empire) Joachim Murat (First French Empire) Michel Ney (First French Empire) Jean-de-Dieu Soult	(Russian Empire) Levin August von Bennigsen (Russian Empire) Barclay de Tolly (WIA) (Russian Empire) Pyotr Bagration (Kingdom of Prussia) Anton Wilhelm von L'Estocq

Units involved
Imperial Guard; III Corps; IV Corps; VI Corps; VII Corps; Reserve Cavalry Corps	2nd Division; 3rd Division; 4th Division; 5th Division; 6th Division; 7th Division; 8th Division; 14th Division; East Prussian Corps

Strength
75,000: Napoleon: 45,000; Ney: 14,500; Davout: 15,000; 300 guns	76,000–83,000: Bennigsen: 67,000; L'Estocq: 9,000; 400 guns

Casualties and losses
15,000–29,643 (Note: Chandler suggests that casualties may have been as high as 25,000 but concedes the actual number cannot be determined; Franceschi gives 14,000; Connelly suggests probably over 15,000. Other sources suggest that their losses approached almost 30,000. According to the estimates of the German historian Horst Schulz, the French lost 4,893 men killed, 23,598 wounded and 1,152 missed in action, which makes a total of 29,643. Of the total losses, 5,200 were caused by Augereau's ill-fated attack, which was carried out in the wrong direction due to a snowstorm. According to the French eyewitness Captain M. Marbot, the combatants of Augereau's corps numbered 3,000 out of 15,000 by the evening of the 8th, commanded by Lieutenant-Colonel Massy.)	15,000–26,000

War of the Fourth Coalition
⬤ current battle
⬤ Napoleon not in command
⬤ Napoleon in command

The Battle of Eylau (also known as the Battle of Preussisch-Eylau) was a bloody and strategically inconclusive battle on 7 and 8 February [O.S. 26 and 27 Jan.] 1807 between Napoleon's Grande Armée and the Imperial Russian Army under the command of General Levin August von Bennigsen near the town of Preussisch Eylau in East Prussia. Late in the battle, the Russians received timely reinforcements from a Prussian division of von L'Estocq. After 1945, the town was renamed Bagrationovsk as part of Kaliningrad Oblast, Russia. The engagement was fought during the War of the Fourth Coalition, part of the Napoleonic Wars.

Napoleon's armies had smashed the army of the Austrian Empire in the Ulm Campaign and the combined Austrian and Russian armies at the Battle of Austerlitz on 2 December 1805. On 14 October 1806, Napoleon crushed the armies of the Kingdom of Prussia at the Battle of Jena–Auerstedt and hunted down the scattered Prussians at Prenzlau, Lübeck, Erfurt, Pasewalk, Stettin, Magdeburg and Hamelin.

In late January, Bennigsen's Russian army went on the offensive in East Prussia, pushing far to the west. Napoleon reacted by mounting a counteroffensive to the north, hoping to prevent their retreat to the east. After his Cossacks had captured a copy of Napoleon's orders, Bennigsen rapidly withdrew to the northeast to avoid being cut off. The French pursued for several days and found the Russians drawn up for battle at Eylau.

On the first day of the battle, in a vicious evening clash, the French captured the village with heavy losses on both sides. The following day brought even more serious fighting. Early in the battle, a frontal attack by Napoleon failed, with catastrophic losses, largely due to the intervention of a snowstorm, which knocked the attacking French off course; they came directly under heavy fire from their own and enemy artillery batteries. The attack cost Napoleon 5,200 casualties. The other limited engagements also yielded no results. To reverse the situation, Napoleon launched a mass cavalry charge led by Marshal Murat against the Russians. The charge bought enough time for the French right wing, led by Marshal Davout, to arrive in force and throw its weight into the contest. The Russian left wing was soon bent back at an acute angle, and Bennigsen's army was in danger of collapse. A Prussian corps belatedly arrived on Bennigsen's orders and saved the day by pushing back the French right. As darkness fell, Marshal Ney's VI corps, which had been in pursuit of the Prussians, appeared on the French left. That night, Bennigsen decided to retreat, leaving Napoleon in possession of a snowy battlefield covered with thousands of dead and wounded.

Eylau was the first serious check to the Grande Armée, and the myth of Napoleon's invincibility was badly shaken. The French went on to decisively defeat Bennigsen's army at the Battle of Friedland, four months later.

== Background ==
With the Prussian army routed at Jena-Auerstedt, Napoleon occupied the major cities of Germany and marched east in pursuit of the remaining forces opposed to him. These were largely Russians under the command of the frail 68-year-old Field Marshal Count Mikhail Kamensky. The old marshal was unwilling to risk battle and continued to retreat, leaving the Grande Armée free to enter Poland almost unopposed. Nevertheless, as the French pressed aggressively eastward across the Vistula, they found the Russians defending the line of the Wkra River. The French seized a crossing over the Wkra on 23 December at the Battle of Czarnowo. Russian resistance soon stiffened, and on 26 December, the two armies clashed at the Battles of Pułtusk and of Gołymin. After the fierce engagements, Napoleon's troops took up winter quarters in Poland to recuperate after a victorious but exhausting campaign.

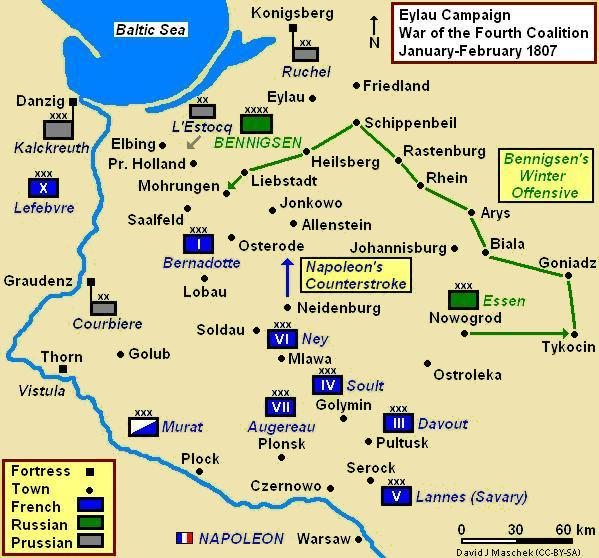
The Eylau campaign map shows movements up to the Battle of Mohrungen on 25 January. German names are used for East Prussian towns. See text for Polish names.

In January 1807, the new Russian army commander, Levin August von Bennigsen, attempted to surprise the French left wing by shifting the bulk of his army north from Nowogród to East Prussia. Incorporating a Prussian corps on his right, he first bumped into elements of the VI Corps of Marshal Michel Ney, who had disobeyed his emperor's orders and advanced far north of his assigned winter cantonments. Having cleared Ney's troops out of the way, the Russians rolled down on the isolated French I Corps under Marshal Jean-Baptiste Bernadotte. Tough fighting at the Battle of Mohrungen allowed Bernadotte's corps to escape serious damage and pull back to the southwest. With his customary inventiveness, Napoleon saw an opportunity to turn the situation to his own advantage. He instructed Bernadotte to withdraw before Bennigsen's forces and ordered the balance of the Grande Armée to strike northward. That maneuver might envelop the Russian army's left flank and cut off its retreat to the east. By a stroke of luck, a band of Cossacks captured a messenger carrying Napoleon's plans to Bernadotte and quickly forwarded the information to General Pyotr Bagration. Bernadotte was left unaware, and a forewarned Bennigsen immediately ordered a retreat east to Jonkowo to avoid the trap.

As Bennigsen hurriedly assembled his army at Jonkowo, elements of Marshal Nicolas Soult's IV Corps reached a position on his left rear on 3 February. That day, General of Division Jean François Leval clashed with Lieutenant-General Nikolay Kamensky's 14th Division at Bergfried (Berkweda) on the Alle (Łyna) River, which flows roughly northward in the area. The French reported 306 casualties but claimed to have inflicted 1,100 on their adversaries. After seizing Allenstein (Olsztyn), Soult moved north on the east bank of the Alle. Meanwhile, Napoleon threatened Bennigsen from the south with Marshal Pierre Augereau's VII Corps and Ney's forces. Kamensky held the west bank with four Russian battalions and three Prussian artillery batteries. After an initial attack on Bergfriede had been driven back, the French captured the village and bridge. A Russian counterattack briefly recaptured the bridge. That night, the French remained in possession of the field, and Soult claimed that he had found 800 Russian dead there. Thus ended the Battle of Allenstein. Marching at night, Bennigsen retreated directly north to Wolfsdorf (Wilczowo) on the 4th. The next day, he fell back to the northeast, reaching Burgerswalde on the road to Landsberg (Górowo Iławeckie).

By early February, the Russian army was in full retreat and was relentlessly pursued by the French. After several aborted attempts to stand and fight, Bennigsen resolved to retreat to the town of Preussisch-Eylau and there make a stand. During the pursuit, perhaps influenced by the dreadful state of the Polish roads, the savage winter weather and the relative ease with which his forces had dealt with Prussia, Napoleon had allowed the Grande Armée to become more spread out than was his custom. In contrast, Bennigsen's forces were already concentrated.

== Battle ==
=== First day ===
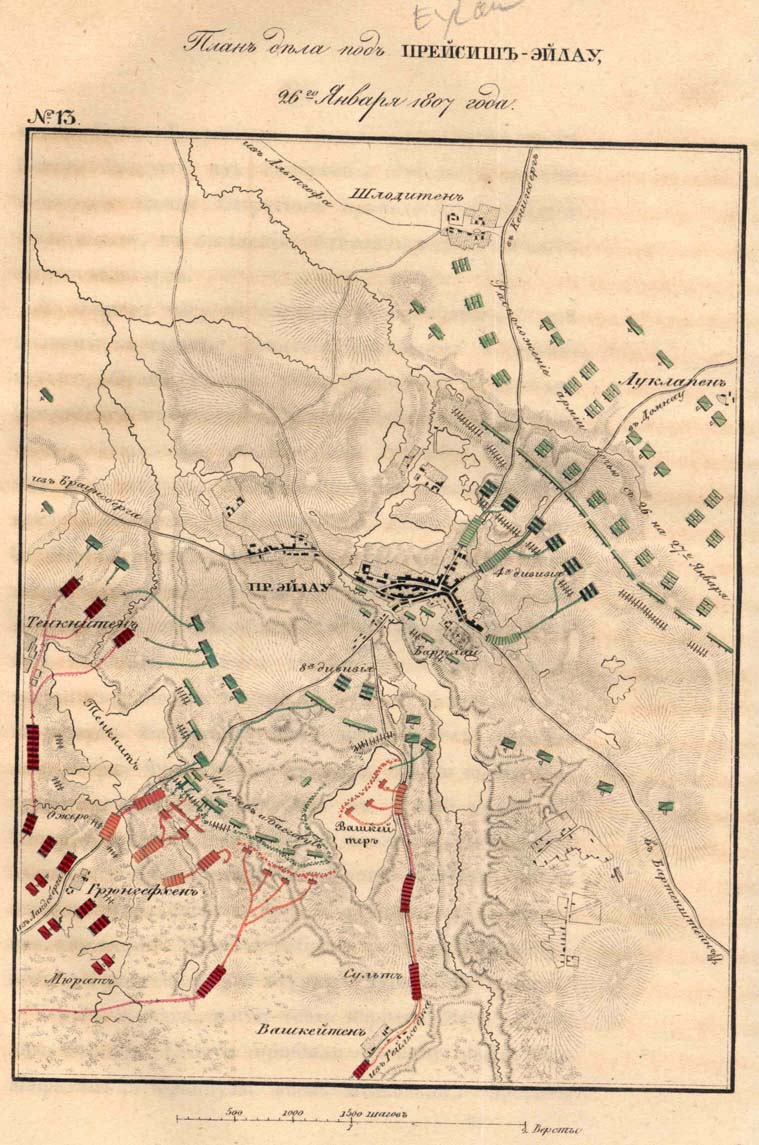
Battle of Eylau in the early stages. French shown in red, Russians in green and Prussians in blue.

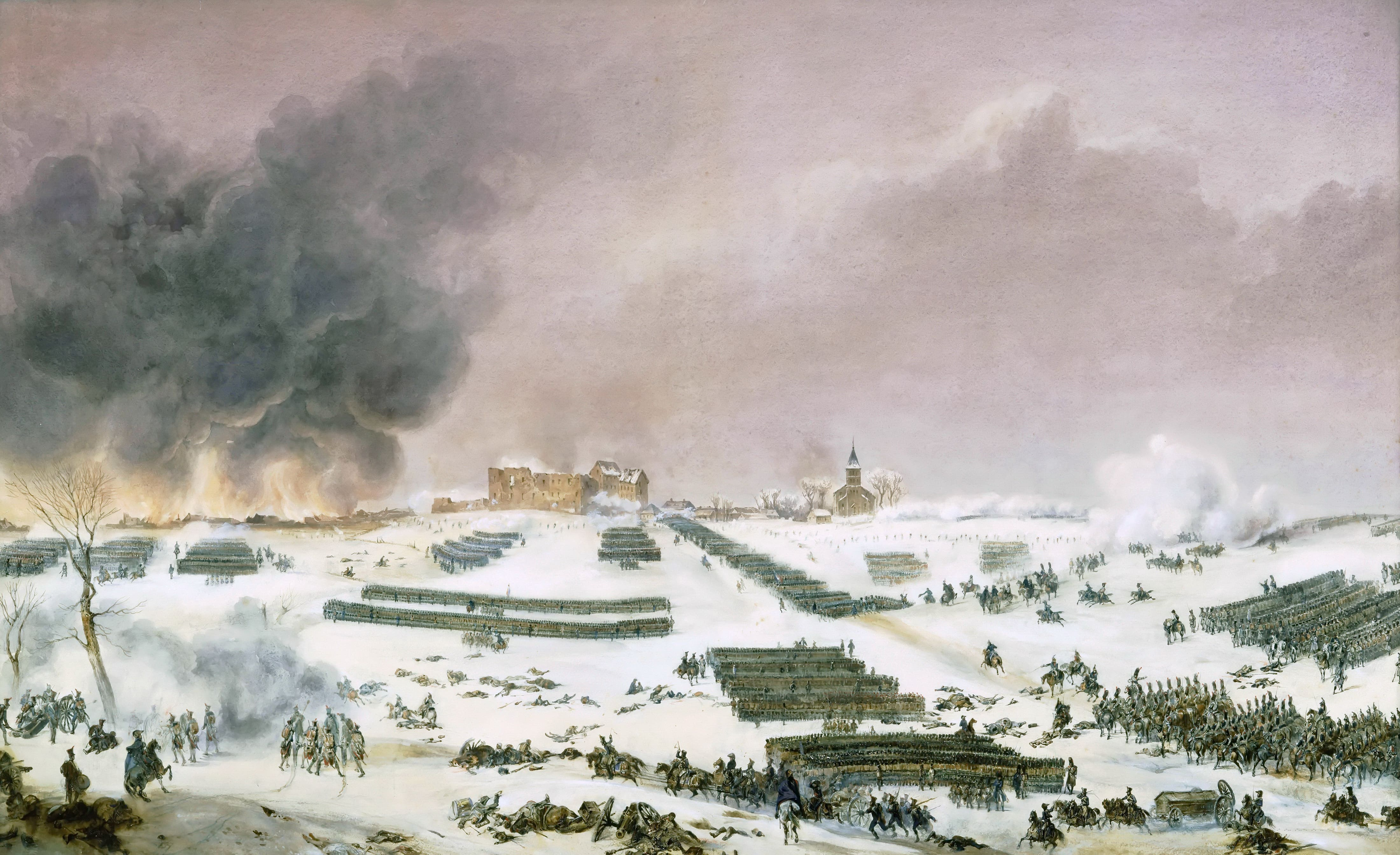
Attack of the cemetery, painted by Jean-Antoine-Siméon Fort

Marshal Soult's IV Corps and Marshal Murat's cavalry were the first French formations to reach the plateau before Eylau at about 14:00 on the 7th. The Russian rearguard under Bagration occupied positions on the plateau about a mile in front of Eylau. The French promptly assaulted the positions and were repulsed. Bagration's orders were to offer stiff resistance to gain time for Bennigsen's heavy artillery to pass through Eylau and to join the Russian army in its position beyond Eylau. During the afternoon, the French were reinforced by Marshal Augereau's corps and the Imperial Guard, giving him a force of about 45,000 soldiers in all. Under pressure of greatly superior forces, Bagration conducted an orderly retreat to join the main army. It was covered by another rearguard detachment in Eylau that was led by Barclay de Tolly.

The rearguard action continued when French forces advanced to assault Barclay's forces in the town of Eylau. Historians differ on the reasons. Napoleon later claimed that was on his orders and that the advance had the dual aims of pinning the Russian force to prevent it from retreating yet again and of providing his soldiers with at least some shelter against the terrible cold. Other surviving evidence, however, strongly suggests that the advance was unplanned and occurred as the result of an undisciplined skirmish, which Marshals Soult and Murat should have acted to quell but failed to do so. Whether or not Napoleon and his generals had considered securing the town to provide the soldiers with shelter for the freezing night, the soldiers may have taken action on their own initiative to secure such a shelter. According to Captain Marbot, the Emperor had told Marshal Augereau that he disliked night fighting, that he wanted to wait until the morning so that he could count on Davout's Corps to come up on the right wing and Ney's on the left and that the high ground before Eylau was a good easily defensible position on which to wait for reinforcements.

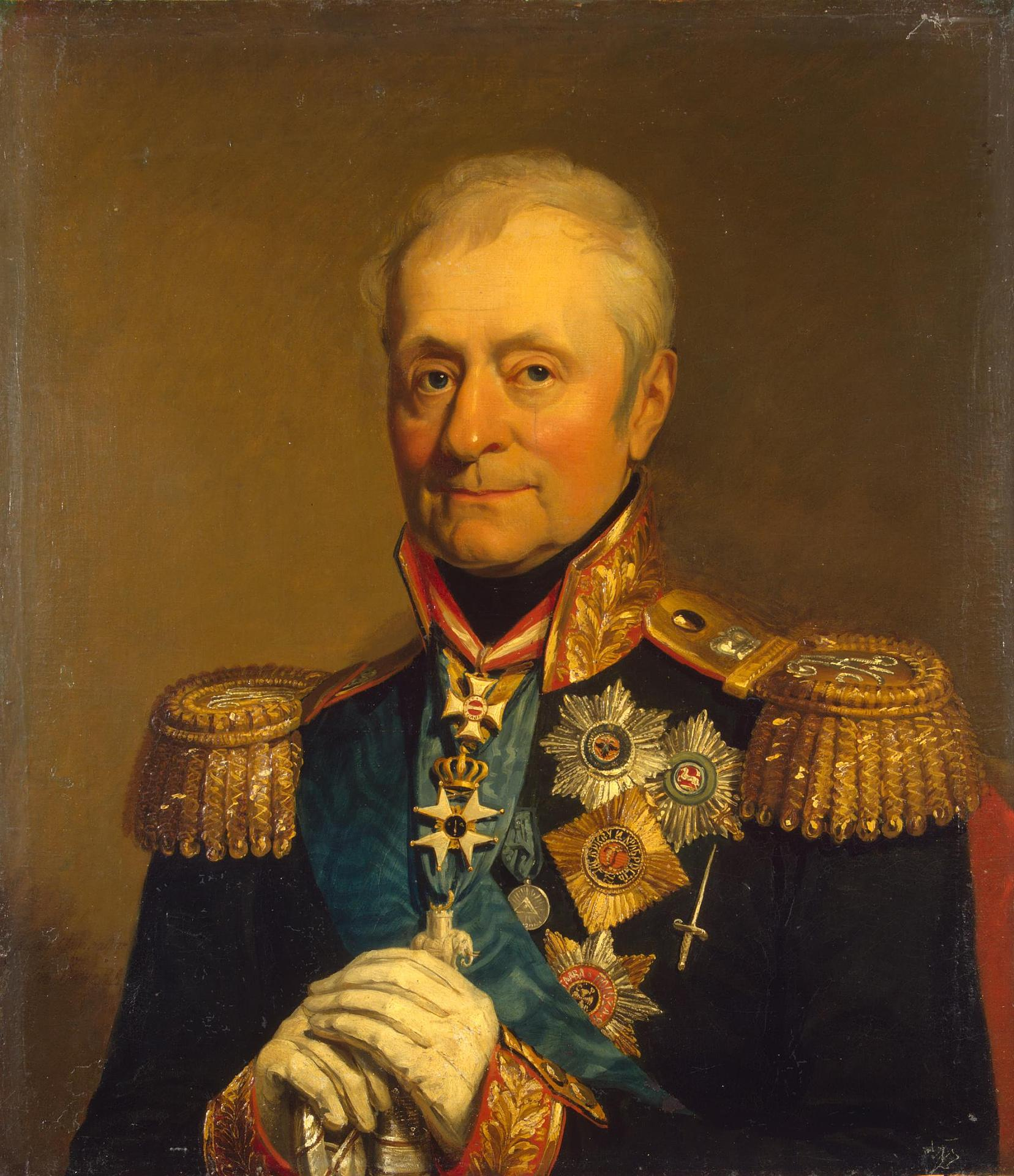
Levin August Bennigsen

Whatever the cause of the fight for the town, it rapidly escalated into a large and bitterly fought engagement, continuing well after night had fallen and resulting in about 4,000 casualties to each side, including Barclay, who was shot in the arm and forced to leave the battlefield. Among other officers, French Brig. Gen. Pierre-Charles Lochet was shot and killed. At 22:00 Bennigsen ordered the Russians to retreat a short distance, leaving the town to the French. He later claimed he abandoned the town to lure the French into attacking his center the next day. Despite their possession of the town, most of the French spent the night in the open, as did all of the Russians. Both sides did without food—the Russians because of their habitual disorganization, the French because of problems with the roads, the weather and the crush of troops hurrying towards the battle.

During the night, Bennigsen withdrew some of his troops from the front line to strengthen his reserve. That resulted in the shortening of his right wing.

=== Second day ===
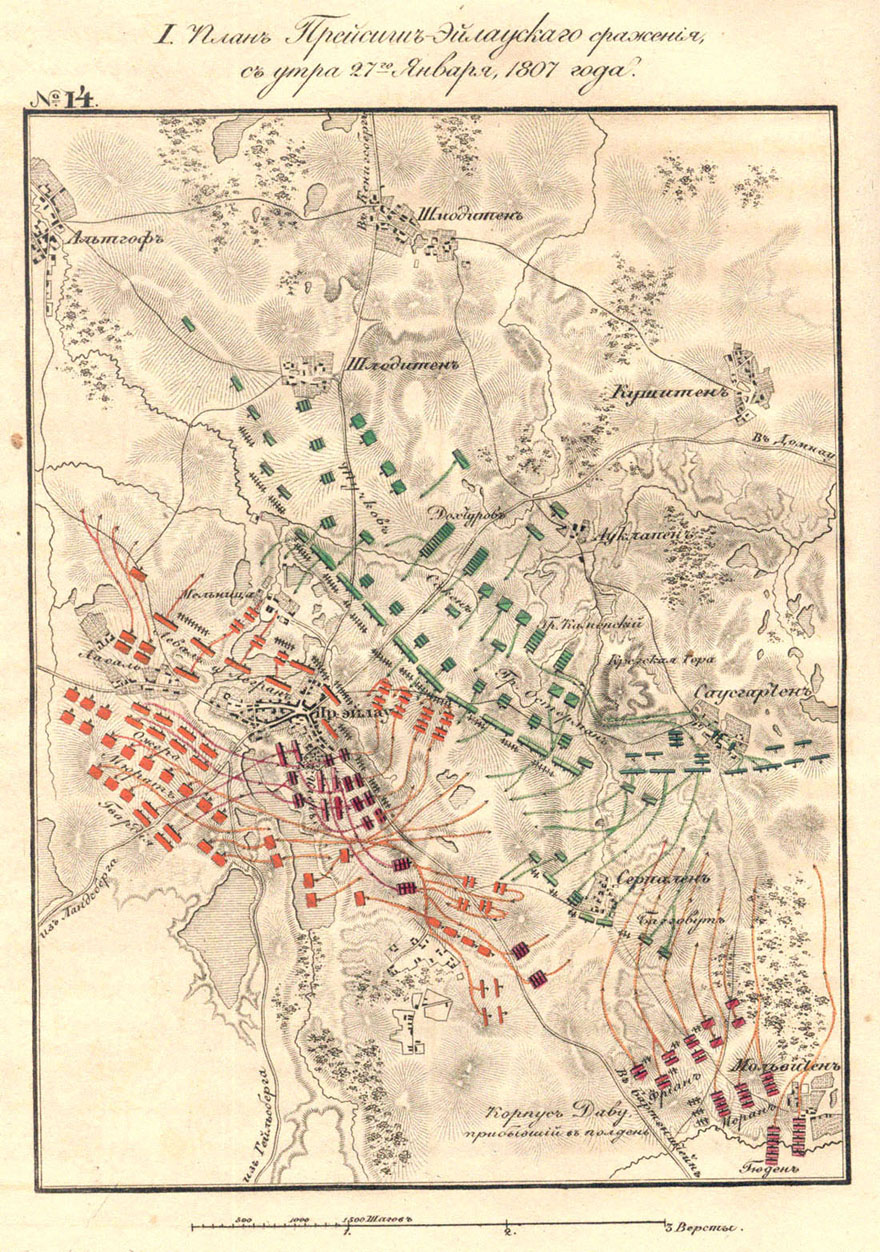
Battle of Eylau early on the second day. French shown in red, Russians in green, Prussians in blue.

Alternative detailed Maps

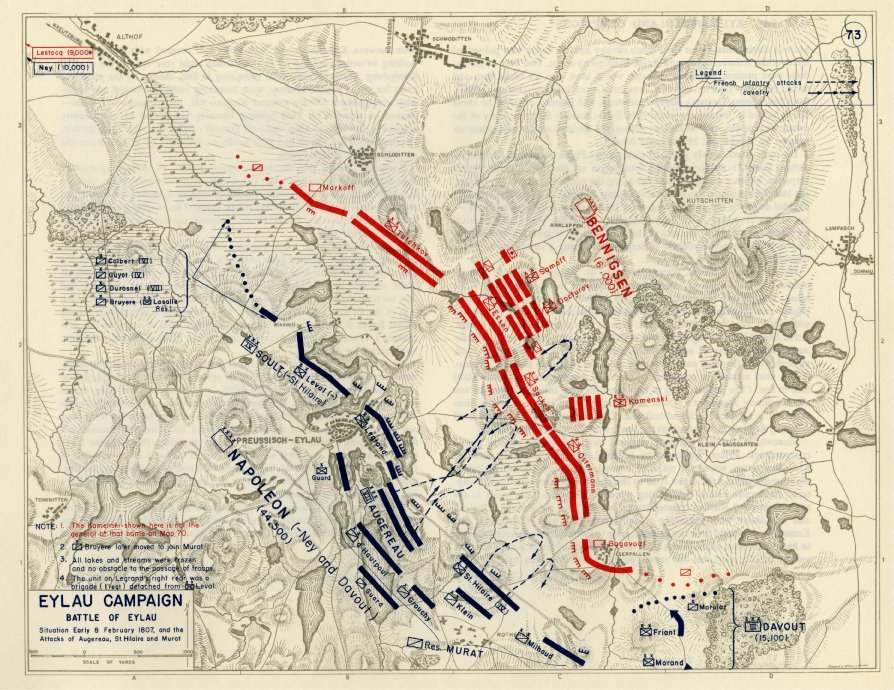
Situation early 8 February 1807

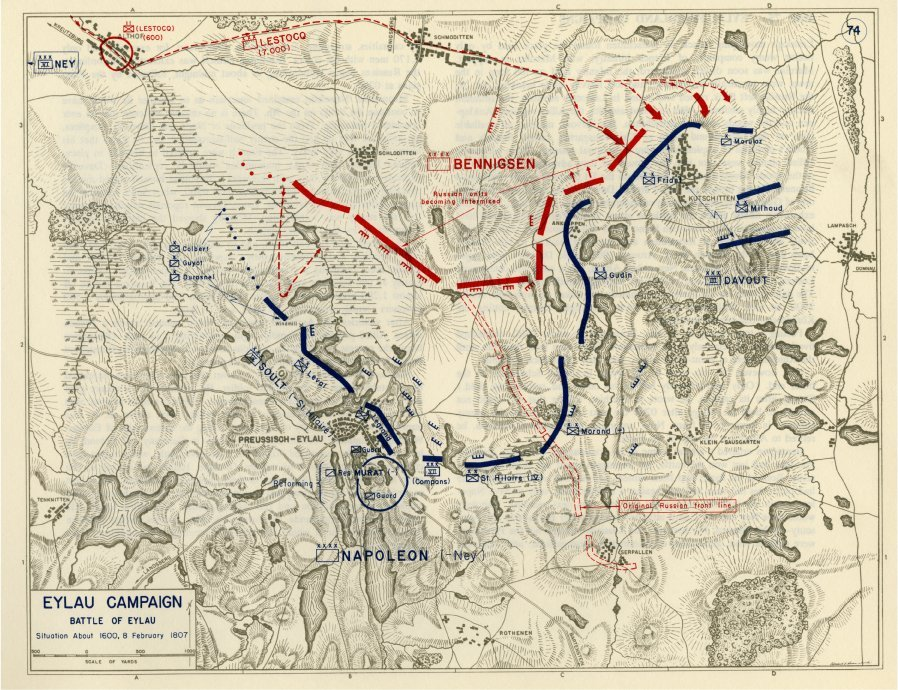
Situation about 1600, 8 February 1807

(by West Point Military Academy)

Bennigsen had 67,000 Russian troops and 400 guns already assembled, but the French had only 49,000 troops and 300 guns. The Russians could expect to be reinforced by Von L'Estocq's detachment of 9,000 Prussians, the French by Marshal Davout's depleted III Corps (proud victors of Auerstedt but now only 15,000 strong) and Marshal Ney's 14,000-strong VI Corps (for a total of 74,000 men), which was shadowing the Prussians. Bernadotte's I Corps was too far distant to take part.

Dawn brought little warmth and no great improvement in visibility since the heavy snowstorms continued throughout the day. The opposing forces occupied two parallel ridges. The French were active early on probing the Russian position, particularly on the Russian right. Bennigsen, fearing that the French would discover that he had shortened his right, opened the battle by ordering his artillery to fire on the French. They replied and the ensuing artillery duel lasted for some time, with the French having the best of it because of their more dispersed locations.

The start of the artillery duel galvanised Napoleon. Until then, he had expected the Russians to continue their retreat, but he now knew that he had a fight on his hands. Messengers hurriedly were dispatched to Ney to order him to march on Eylau and to join the French left wing.

Meanwhile, the French had occupied in force some fulling mill buildings within musket range of the Russian right wing. Russian jaegers ejected them. Both sides escalated the fight, with the Russians assaulting the French left on Windmill Knoll to the left of Eylau. Napoleon interpreted the Russian efforts on his left as a prelude to an attack on Eylau from that quarter. By then, Davout's III Corps had begun to arrive on the Russian left.

To forestall the perceived Russian attack on Eylau and to pin the Russian army so that Davout's flank attack would be more successful, Napoleon launched an attack against the Russian centre and left, with Augereau's VII Corps on the left and Saint-Hilaire's Division of Soult's IV Corps on the right.

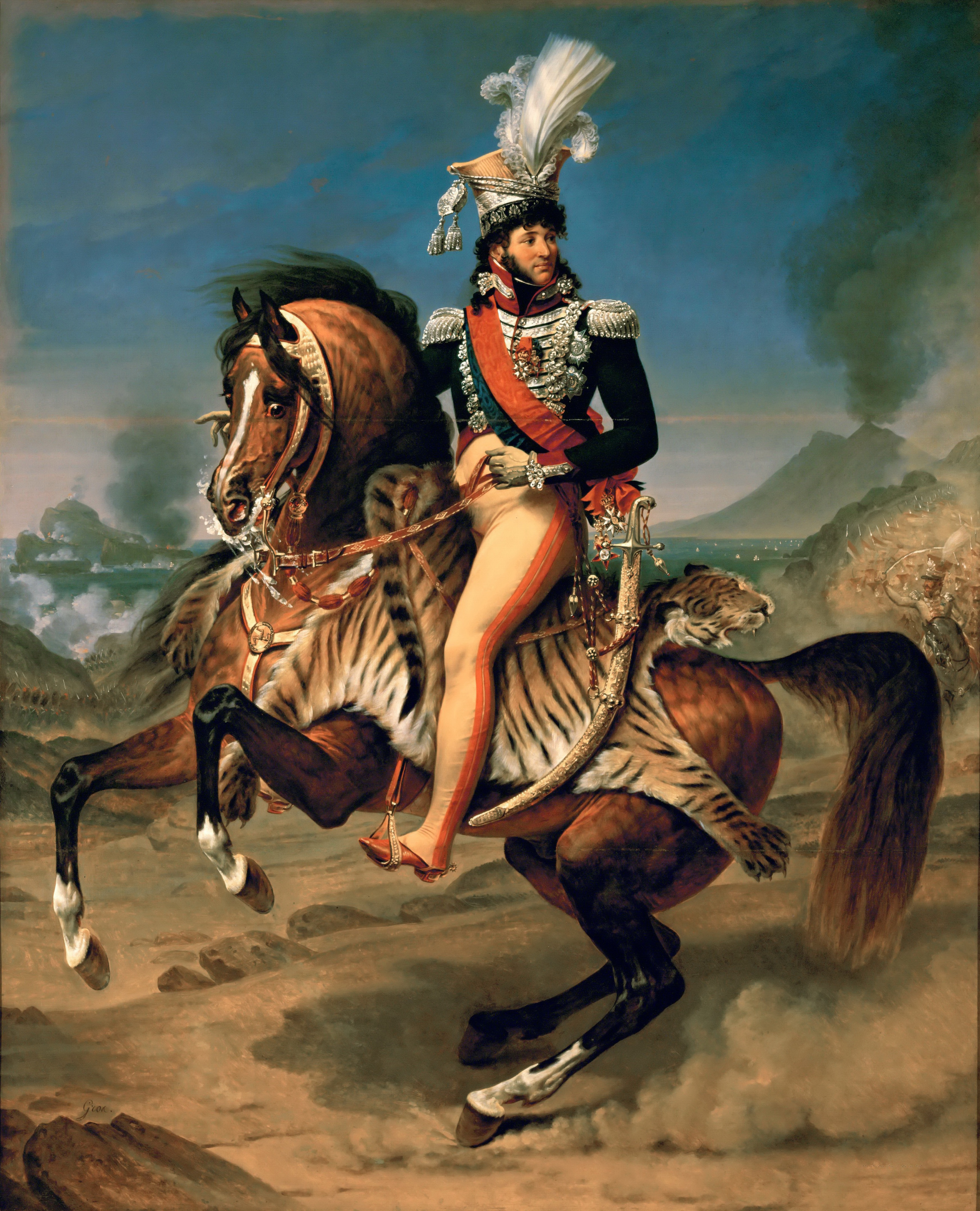
Portrait of Joachim Murat by Antoine-Jean Gros

Augereau was very ill and had to be helped onto his horse. Fate intervened to turn the attack into a disaster. As soon as the French marched off a blizzard descended, causing all direction to be lost. Augereau's corps followed the slope of the land and veered off to the left, away from Saint-Hilaire. Augereau's advance struck the Russian line at the junction of its right and centre, coming under the fire of the blinded French artillery and then point-blank fire of the massive 70-gun Russian centre battery. Meanwhile, Saint-Hilaire's division, advancing alone in the proper direction, was unable to have much effect against the Russian left.

Augereau's corps was thrown into great confusion with heavy losses, Historian Francis Petre gives Augereau's official tally of 929 killed and 4,271 wounded; a total of 5,200. One regiment, the 14th Ligne, was unable to retreat and fought to the last man, refusing to surrender; its eagle was carried off by Captain Marbot. Its position would be marked by a square of corpses. Bennigsen took full advantage by falling on Saint-Hilaire's division with more cavalry and bringing up his reserve infantry to attack the devastated French centre. Augereau and the survivors fell back on Eylau, where they were attacked by about 5,000 Russian infantry. At one point, Napoleon himself, using the church tower as a command post, was nearly captured, but members of his personal staff held the Russians off for just long enough to allow some battalions of the Guard to come up. Counterattacked by the Guard's bayonet charge and Bruyère's cavalry in its rear, the attacking Russian column was nearly destroyed. For four hours, the French centre was in great disorder, virtually defenceless and in imminent danger.

With his centre almost broken, Napoleon resorted to ordering a massive charge by Murat's 11,000-strong cavalry reserve. Aside from the Guard, that was the last major unbloodied body of troops remaining to the French.

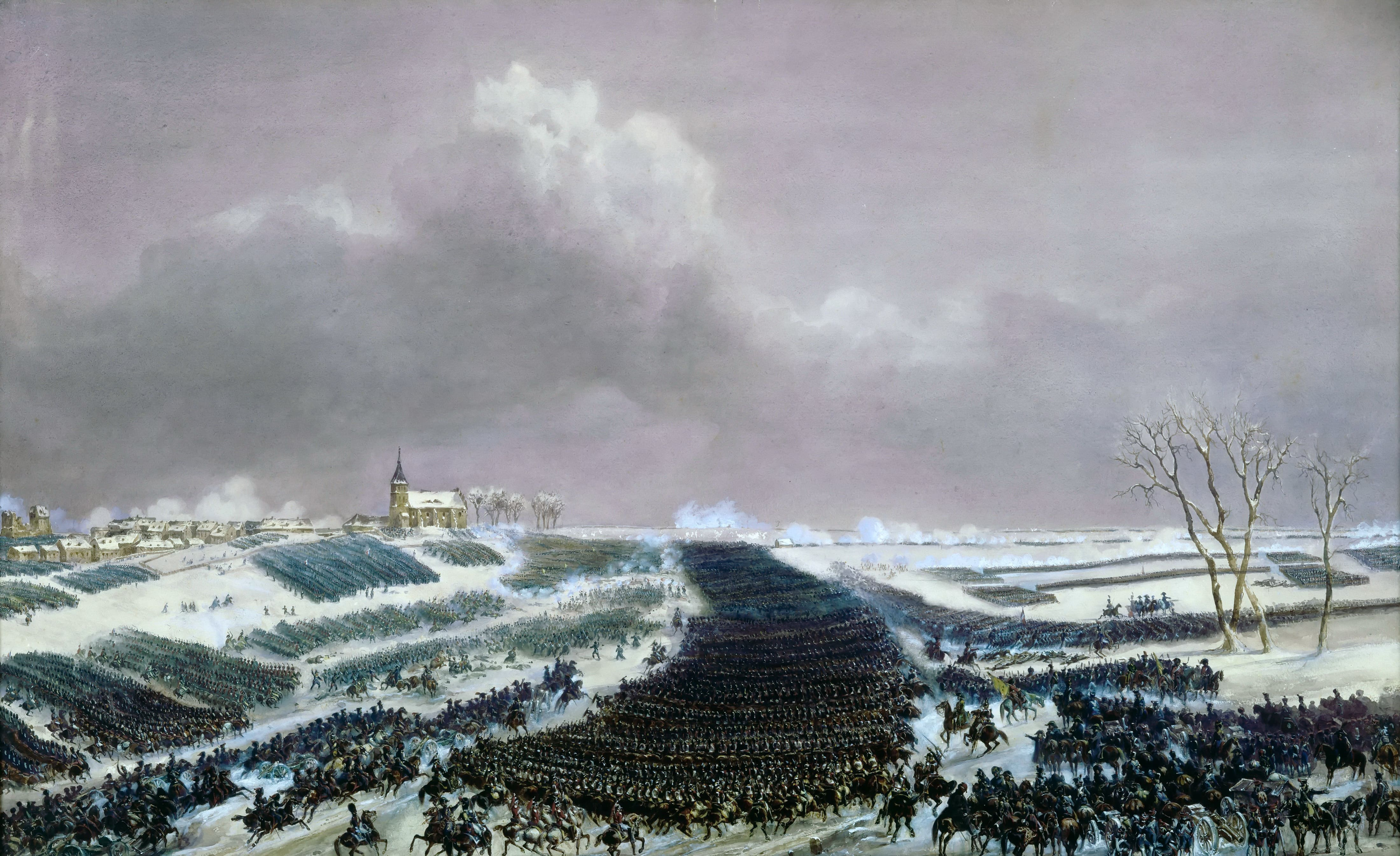
Cavalry charge painted by Jean-Antoine-Siméon Fort.

==== Cavalry charge at Eylau ====
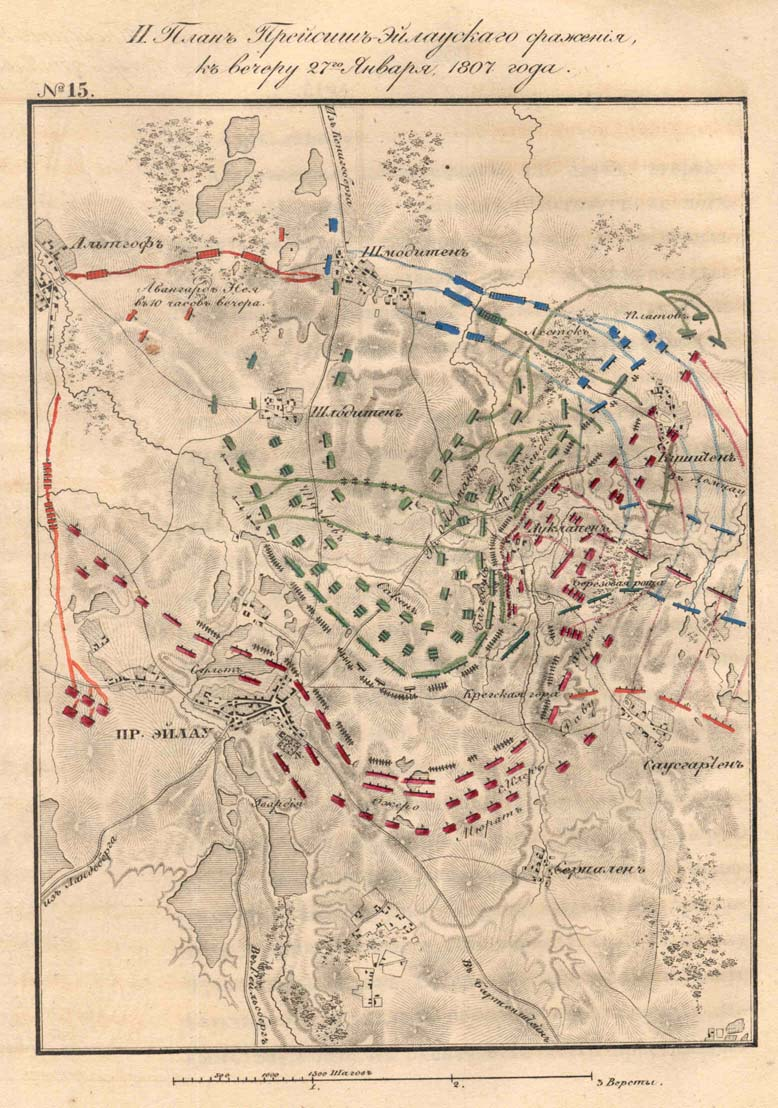
Battle of Eylau after Davout's attack late in the day. French shown in red, Russians in green and Prussians in blue.

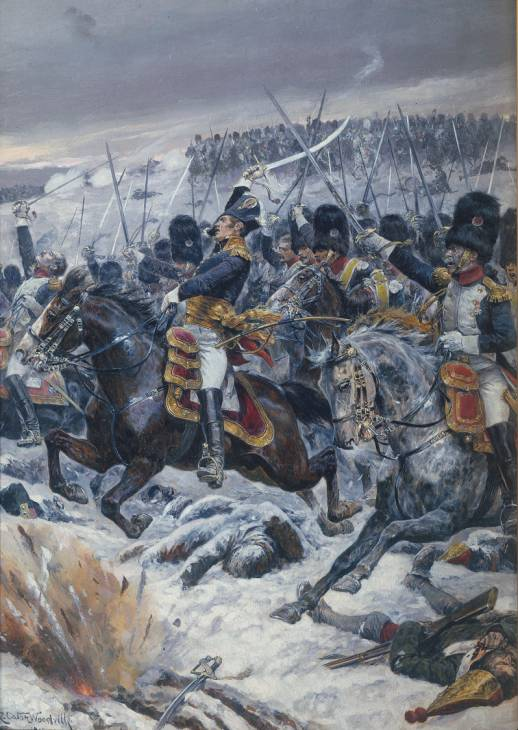
The Grenadiers à Cheval de la Garde Impériale charge at Eylau.

Thus began one of the greatest cavalry charges in history. Somewhat obscured by the weather, Murat's squadrons charged through the Russian infantry around Eylau and then divided into two groups. The group on the right, Grouchy's dragoons, charged into the flank of the Russian cavalry attacking Saint-Hilaire's division and scattered them completely. Now led by Murat himself, the dragoons wheeled left against the Russian cavalry in the centre, and, joined by d'Hautpoult's cuirassier division, drove the Russian cavalry back on their infantry. Fresh Russian cavalry forced Murat and the dragoons to retire, but d'Hautpoult's cuirassiers burst through everything, and the broken Russians were cut to pieces by fresh regiments of cuirassiers.

D'Hautpoult then rode through the Russian guns, chased off or sabered the gunners, and broke through the first line of Russian infantry. He meanwhile trampled a battalion that had attempted to stand. The cuirassiers forced their way through the second line of Russians, and it was only after 2,500 yards that the charge finally expended its force in front of the Russian reserves. A second wave of cavalry consisting of the Guards, and Grouchy's dragoons now charged the Russians as they attempted to reform and rode through both lines of infantry. Another group charged into the Russian infantry in the area in which Augereau's corps had made its stand. Not content with the heavy blows, the cavalry reformed, wheeled and charged back again. It finally retired under the protection of the Guard cavalry. Murat had lost 1,000–1,500 well-trained troopers but relieved the pressure on Augereau, Saint-Hilaire and Soult, paralyzing the Russians long enough to allow Davout to deploy in strength. Rarely had French cavalry played such a pivotal part in a battle. That was in part because for the first time, Murat's men were now mounted on the best cavalry horses in Europe, which had been freshly requisitioned in the aftermath of the conquest of Prussia.

Davout's corps, about 15,000 strong, was now in position and began to drive in the Russian left. Despite the disarray of the Russian centre, Napoleon declined to follow up Murat's charge by advancing with the Guard. Such a move might have decisively won the battle, but Napoleon, well aware that 9,000 Prussians under L'Estocq and his chief of staff, Gerhard von Scharnhorst were still unaccounted for, judged it wise to retain the Guard in reserve. Through the afternoon Soult, Augereau and Murat managed to hold their ground while Davout, assisted by Saint-Hilaire, gradually bent the Russian left back further and further, pushing it to a right angle with the Russian centre. By 15:30, it seemed that the Russians' cohesion would soon break, as their left was in full retreat.

For several crucial hours, Bennigsen could not be found. He had personally ridden to L'Estocq to urge that general to hasten the march of his Prussian corps to the battlefield. His mission was successful since L'Estocq's 9,000-man Prussian force, having lost a third of its strength to Ney's pursuit, approached the battlefield via the Russian right and passed completely behind the Russian position to its left wing. It gathered strength in doing so by collecting Russian stragglers and adding them to the 6,000 remaining Prussian troops. At 16:00, L'Estocq counterattacked by falling on Davout's exposed right flank, and the heartened Russians soon launched a fresh attack against Davout. The Russian situation was also improved by the accurate fire of 36 guns under Aleksey Petrovich Yermolov. Over the next three hours, Davout was halted and forced back to a line running from the village of Kutschitten to near the village of Anklappen towards Saint-Hilaire's right by Eylau. Davout, alert to the danger, formed a battery of his guns on the heights of Klein Sausgarten and personally rallied his troops while his guns drove the Prussians back into the woods. With nightfall, exhaustion set in and fighting on the Russian left petered out.

By then, the roar of cannons on the Russian right had announced Ney's arrival. Napoleon had not recalled Ney until 08:00 of the 8th, when he realised that the Russians intended to fight. Although Ney was within marching distance of the battle, the heavy snow had muffled the sound of cannon fire, and he was completely unaware of the events until a messenger reached him around 10:30. Somewhat delayed by L'Estocq's rear guard, the leading division of Ney's corps did not reach the battlefield until around 19:00 and immediately swept forward into the Russian right and rear. Bennigsen counterattacked, and bitter fighting continued until 22:00, when both sides drew off a little. After a contentious council of war in which several of his generals forcefully argued for continuing the fight for a third day, Bennigsen at 23:00 decided to withdraw, and covered by the Cossacks, the Russians silently began to leave. The exhausted French did not even notice until 03:00 and were in no condition to pursue.

== Aftermath ==
After 14 hours of continuous battle, the only result was an enormous loss of life. Authors differ greatly in their assessments of the relative losses: estimates of Russian casualties range from about 15,000 to 20,000 killed or wounded and 3,000 men, 23 cannon and 16 colors captured. Count von Bennigsen estimated his losses at up to 9,000 dead and 7,000 wounded. The French lost somewhere between 10,000 and 15,000. Connelly suggests probably over 15,000. Franceschi gives 14,000 and Adams, Petre and Dwyer give 25,000–30,000 with five eagles lost. David G. Chandler suggested as many as 25,000 French casualties but concedes that it is impossible to be certain. According to estimates of the German historian Horst Schulz, the French lost 4,893 men killed, 23,598 wounded and 1,152 missing in action, for a total of 29,643.

The French had gained possession of the battlefield, which was nothing but a vast expanse of bloodstained snow and frozen corpses, but they had suffered enormous losses and failed to destroy the Russian army. Riding over the fields of Eylau the following morning, Marshal Ney observed, Quel massacre! Et sans résultat! ("What a massacre! And without result!").

The Battle of Eylau was a major contrast to the decisive victories that characterized Napoleon's earlier campaigns, and would be a sign of the brutal slugfest for battles that were to come. By halting the French advance and leaving the two sides exhausted but evenly matched, it served only to prolong the war. After the battle, Napoleon sent General Bertrand to the King of Prussia to offer a separate peace, which would see French forces withdraw from Prussia and her borders completely restored. Prussia, wishing to continue its alliance with Russia, quickly rejected that offer. Hostilities continued until the decisive French victory at the Battle of Friedland in June 1807 forced Tsar Alexander I to the negotiating table. After a personal meeting between the two emperors, both sides signed the peace Treaties of Tilsit. They were much harsher on Prussia than the earlier peace offer and resulted in the loss of almost half of its territory.

The surgeon-in-chief of Napoleon's Grand Army, Baron Dominique-Jean Larrey, served the wounded with the flesh of young horses as soup and bœuf à la mode. The good results encouraged him to promote the consumption of horse meat in France. Larrey is quoted in French by Béraud.

== In literature and the arts ==
Antoine-Jean Gros painted Napoleon on the Battlefield of Eylau in Paris in 1808.

The battle is included in Leo Tolstoy's War and Peace.

The Battle of Eylau forms the early part of the novel The Schirmer Inheritance (1953) by Eric Ambler. The brutal battle and its immediate aftermath are depicted from the point of view of an ordinary soldier, a Prussian cavalry sergeant, who is severely wounded by a French saber in the later part of the confused fighting and whose only chance of saving his life is to desert and find shelter with Polish peasants in the neighborhood.

In the novel Le Colonel Chabert of French author Honoré de Balzac, Eylau is the battle where the colonel describes having been mistakenly reported as killed.

The Battle of Eylau was reconstructed in the home computer strategy game Napoleon at War released by C.C.S. in 1986 and written by Ken Wright.

The second day of the battle was shown in the miniseries Napoléon.

== Notes ==
Preceded by Battle of Mohrungen	Napoleonic Wars; Battle of Eylau	Succeeded by Battle of Ostrołęka (1807)
