= Christian Karl August Ludwig von Massenbach =

Prussian soldier (1758–1827)

- Born: 16 April 1758; Schmalkalden, Prussia
- Died: 21 November 1827 (aged 69); Białokosz, Prussia (now Poland)

Christian Karl August Ludwig von Massenbach (16 April 1758 – 21 November 1827) was a Prussian soldier, was born at Schmalkalden, and educated at Heilbronn and Stuttgart, devoting himself chiefly to mathematics.

He became an officer of the Württemberg army in 1778, and left this for the service of Frederick the Great in 1782. The pay of his rank was small, and his appointment on the quartermaster-general's staff made it necessary to keep two horses, so that he had to write mathematical school-books in his spare time to eke out his resources. He was far however from neglecting the science and art of war, for thus early he had begun to make his name as a theorist as well as a mathematician. After serving as instructor in mathematics to the young prince Louis, he took part with credit in the expedition into the Netherlands, and was given the order Pour le mérite.

On returning to Prussia Massenbach became mathematical instructor at the school of military engineering, leaving this post in 1792 to take part as a general staff officer in the war against France. He was awarded a prebend (sic) at Minden for his services as a topographical engineer at the Battle of Valmy, and after serving through the campaigns of 1793 and 1794 he published a number of memoirs on the military history of these years.

However, Massenbach was chiefly occupied with framing schemes for the reorganization of the then neglected general staff of the Prussian army, and many of his proposals were accepted. Bronsart von Schellendorf, in his Duties of the General Staff, says of Massenbach's work in this connection, that the organization which he proposed and in the main carried out survived even the catastrophes of 1806-1807, and exists even now in its original outline. This must be accounted as high praise when it is remembered how much of the responsibility for these very disasters must be laid to Massenbach's account. The permanent gain to the service due to his exertions was far more than formal, for it is to him that the general staff owes its tradition of thorough and patient individual effort. But the actual doctrine taught by Massenbach, who was now a colonel, may be summarized as the doctrine of positions carried to a ludicrous excess; the claims put forward for the general staff, that it was to prepare cut-and-dried plans of operations in peace which were to be imposed on the troop leaders in war, were derided by the responsible generals; and the memoirs on proposed plans of campaign to suit certain political combinations were worked out in quite unnecessary detail. It was noteworthy that none of the proposed plans of campaign considered France as an enemy.

In 1805 came threats of the war with Napoleon which Massenbach had strongly opposed. He was made quartermaster-general (chief of staff) to Prince Hohenlohe, over whom he soon obtained a fatal ascendancy. War was averted for a moment by the result of the Battle of Austerlitz, but it broke out in earnest in October 1806. Massenbach's influence clouded all the Prussian operations.

The afternoon before the crushing Prussian defeat at the Battle of Jena, Massenbach convinced Hohenlohe not to drive Louis Gabriel Suchet's division off the height to the west of Jena, which should have been an easy thing to do for the 38,000 available troops. Consequently, Napoleon was able to mass a large force on the key height the night before the 14 October battle. At the Battle of Prenzlau on 28 October, Massenbach was completely fooled by French claims that the Prussians were surrounded by overwhelming numbers. He bore a heavy responsibility for convincing Prince Hohenlohe to capitulate, when escape was still possible.

Even suggestions of disloyalty were not wanting; an attempt to try him by court-martial was only frustrated by Prince Hohenlohe's action in taking upon himself, as commander-in-chief, the whole responsibility for Massenbach's actions. Massenbach then retired to his estate in the Grand Duchy of Posen, and occupied himself in writing pamphlets, memoirs, and so forth. When his estates passed into the grand duchy of Warsaw, he chose to remain a Prussian subject, and on the outbreak of the war of liberation he asked in vain for a post on the Prussian staff. After the fall of Napoleon he took part in Württemberg politics, was expelled from Stuttgart and Heidelberg, and soon afterwards arrested at Frankfurt-on-the-Main, delivered over to the Prussian authorities and condemned to fourteen years fortress imprisonment for his alleged publication of state secrets in his memoirs. He was kept in prison till 1826, when Frederick William III, having recovered from an accident, pardoned those whom he considered to have wronged him most deeply. He died at his estate of Białokosz in the Prussian Partition of Poland.

The obituary in Neuer Nekrolog der Deutschen, pt. ii. (Ilmenau, 1827) is founded on a memoir (Der Oberst C. v. Massenbach) which was published at the beginning of his imprisonment.
