= Napoleon on the Battlefield of Eylau =

Painting by Antoine-Jean Gros

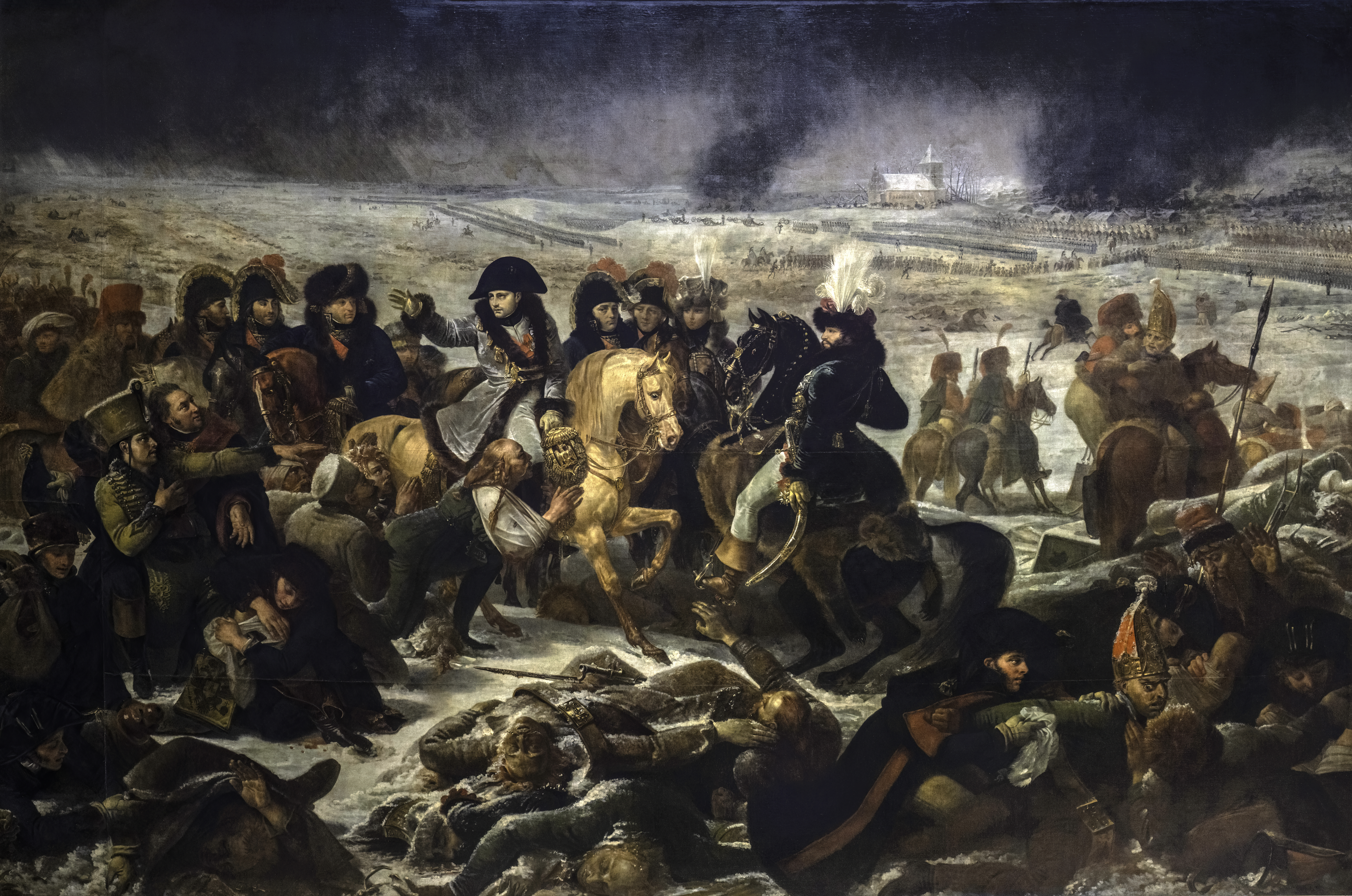
- Artist: Antoine-Jean Gros
- Year: 1807–1808
- Medium: Oil on canvas
- Dimensions: 521 cm × 784 cm (205 in × 309 in)
- Location: Musée du Louvre; Paris

Napoleon on the Battlefield of Eylau (French: Napoléon sur le champ de bataille d'Eylau) is an oil painting of 1808 by French Romantic painter Antoine-Jean Gros. Completed during the winter of 1807–1808, the work became an icon of the emerging style of French Romanticism. It depicts a moment from the aftermath of the bloody Battle of Eylau (7–8 February 1807) in which Napoleon Bonaparte surveys the battlefield where his Grande Armée secured a costly victory against the Russians. Although Napoleon on the Battlefield of Eylau retains elements of history painting, it is by far Gros's most realistic work depicting Napoleon and breaks from the subtlety of Neoclassicism. The painting is housed at the Louvre in Paris.

== Background ==
In early February 1807, the Imperial Russian Army, under the command of Levin August von Bennigsen, was in full retreat while being pursued by Napoléon Bonaparte's Grande Armée. The field armies of Russia's ally, the Kingdom of Prussia, had been decisively defeated by the Grande Armée at the double Battle of Jena–Auerstedt on 14 October 1806. This left the Russian army as the only major land force opposing Napoléon in the War of the Fourth Coalition. After some failed attempts to disrupt the French advance, Bennigsen decided to regroup his retreating forces at the Prussian village of Eylau (now Bagrationovsk, Kaliningrad Oblast).

Fighting began in the afternoon of 7 February when Napoleon's baggage section arrived at Eylau in preparation for the Emperor's arrival, unaware of the Russian presence still in the village. Thinking the French were attempting to capture the village, Bennigsen sent reinforcements to Eylau; Napoléon reciprocated with his own fighting force. Intense engagements followed, especially around the village's church and cemetery, but the French held control of Eylau by the end of the day.

The Russians countered in the early morning of 8 February with a massive artillery bombardment. On the brink of a disastrous defeat, Napoléon called upon the Reserve Cavalry Corps to charge the Russian columns approaching Eylau. It disrupted the Russian offensive long enough for the French lines to stabilize. By nightfall, Bennigsen ordered his forces to withdraw: the French, though able to declare a victory, were left with a snowy battlefield riddled with blood and frozen corpses.

== Commission ==
Napoléon sought to ensure that the victory at Eylau, though costly, would not be forgotten, entrusting the director of the Louvre Vivant Denon with commissioning an artist as a part of a much larger propaganda campaign. One month after the battle, Denon announced a public competition for the commission: 26 artists sent in their sketches which were exhibited at the Louvre. Antoine-Jean Gros was declared the winner on 13 June, and completed Napoléon on the Battlefield of Eylau during the winter of 1807–1808. According to François de Vergnette, Denon stipulated much of what was to be featured in the painting, including "the moment to be depicted, the number of 'extras', the cadavers in the foreground, and the large format".

== Description ==
The painting portrays Napoleon arriving outside Eylau to survey the battlefield on 9 February 1807, the day after the fighting ended. The painting is on a monumental scale of 521 x 784 cm, such that most of the central figures are rendered life-sized. Some of the figures on the edges of the painting are intentionally cut off to instil a feeling of the work being an actual fragment of a real-life scene. The viewer's attention is immediately drawn to the large pile of corpses in the foreground whose faces are twice life-sized; another soldier, wounded, cries out in a state of madness. According to the 64th Grande Armée Bulletin, the scene was designed "to instil in princes a love of peace and a horror of war".

In the center of the painting Napoléon is seen mounted on a light bay horse surveying the treatment of the wounded, his hand outstretched in a pose reminiscent of blessing the soldiers. "The consoling expression of the great man", wrote Denon, "seems to soften the horrors of death and spread a softer light on this scene of carnage". He is surrounded by members of his staff: Marshal Berthier, Marshal Bessières, and General Caulaincourt are to the left, while Marshal Soult, Marshal Davout and Marshal Murat flank on the right. A wounded Lithuanian soldier, taken aback by the compassion of the Emperor, pledges his allegiance to Napoléon while another former combatant embraces his leg.

== Reception and legacy ==
Napoléon on the Battlefield of Eylau was first shown at the Paris Salon of 1808. Initially, some politicians suspected the painting aimed to portray the Emperor unfavorably, but Napoléon himself approved of Gros's work and presented him with the Légion d'honneur at the painter's award ceremony. Gros's depiction of Napoléon displayed a degree of realism not present in his earlier painting of the Emperor, Bonaparte Visiting the Plague Victims of Jaffa (1804), nor those by any other artist. In its portrayal of the unpleasant truth of war, Napoléon on the Battlefield of Eylau breaks with the prevailing style of Neoclassicism and was an early landmark in the emerging Romantic movement. Its influence is apparent in the works of French artists like Théodore Géricault and Eugène Delacroix, themselves both pioneers of Romanticism.
