= Siege of Magdeburg (1806) =

1806 Siege during the War of the Fourth Coalition

- Part of the War of the Fourth Coalition
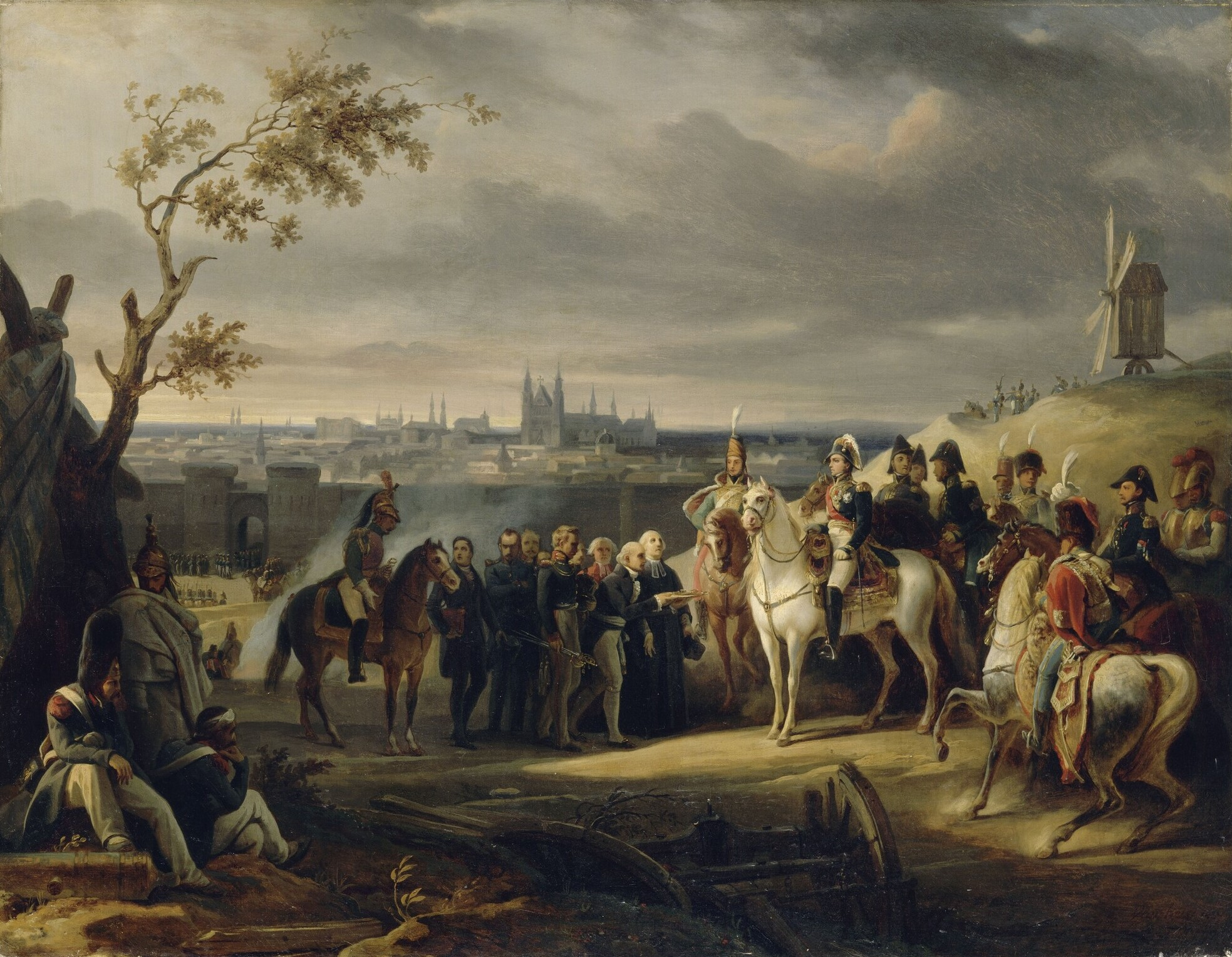
- Capitulation of Magdeburg, 8 November 1806 by Théophile-Auguste Vauchelet, 1837
Date	25 October – 8 November 1806
Location	Magdeburg, Kingdom of Prussia 52.1333°N 11.6167°E
Result	French victory
Territorial changes	Capitulation of the Prussian garrison: capture of Prussia's second-largest city on 11 November 1806

Belligerents
(France) French Empire	Kingdom of Prussia

Commanders and leaders
(France) Michel Ney	(Kingdom of Prussia) Franz von Kleist

Strength
16,000–25,000 men	24,000–25,000 men 700 artillery pieces

Casualties and losses
Light	Entire garrison and 20 generals POW; 54 flags, 700 artillery captured

War of the Fourth Coalition
⬤ current battle
⬤ Napoleon not in command
⬤ Napoleon in command

The siege of Magdeburg (French: Siège de Magdebourg) took place from 25 October to 8 November 1806 during the War of the Fourth Coalition. A French force, initially under the command of Marshal Joachim Murat, then a French army Corps under the command of Marshal Michel Ney, laid siege and eventually obtained the surrender of Franz Kasimir von Kleist's Prussian force that had taken refuge in Magdeburg, Prussia's second city.

== Siege ==
After the twin battles of Jena and Auerstaedt, the victorious Grande Armée pursued the remains of the Prussian army, a part of which was under the command of Prince Hohenlohe, who directed it towards the fortified city of Magdeburg. Commanding the French force, Marshal Murat requested Hohenlohe's surrender, which the Prince refused, managing to escape the besieged fortress. Command was delegated to General of Infantry Kleist, who still had a numerous garrison of 25,000 men. While the French force initially outnumbered the defenders, Emperor Napoleon I recalled the Army Corps of Marshal Jean-de-Dieu Soult, leaving Marshal Ney and his 18,000-man Corps to besiege the city. Occupying both banks of the Elbe, Ney did not display sufficient vigor during the siege, with military action reduced to a mere series of skirmishes and a timid sortie attempt by Kleist, on 4 November. Despite Kleist's initial attempt to bolster the fading morale of his troops by declaring that he would surrender Magdeburg to the enemy only when his handkerchief would ignite in his pocket, faced with the prospect of a full-scale bombardment, the Prussians decided to open negotiations and an armistice was concluded on November 7, with the garrison capitulating the next day and evacuating the fortress on 11 November as prisoners of war.

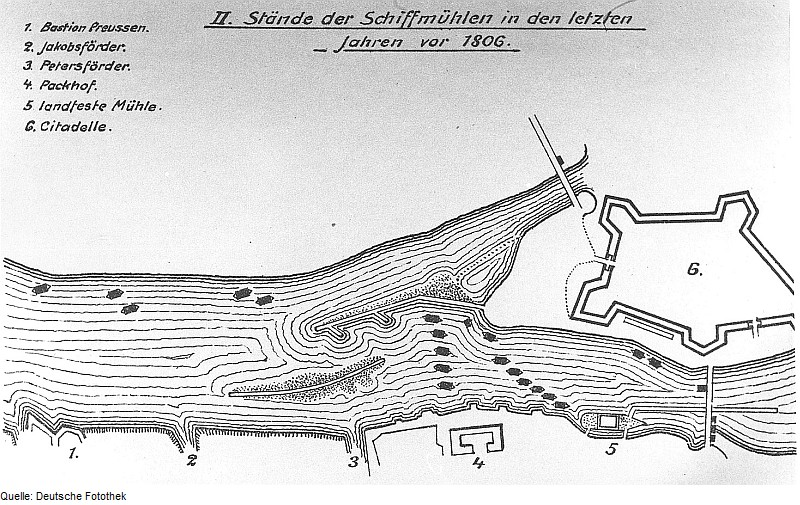
A map of the fortified city of Magdeburg in 1806.

== Notes ==
Preceded by Battle of Halle	Napoleonic Wars; Siege of Magdeburg (1806)	Succeeded by Battle of Prenzlau
