= Białokosz =

- Village
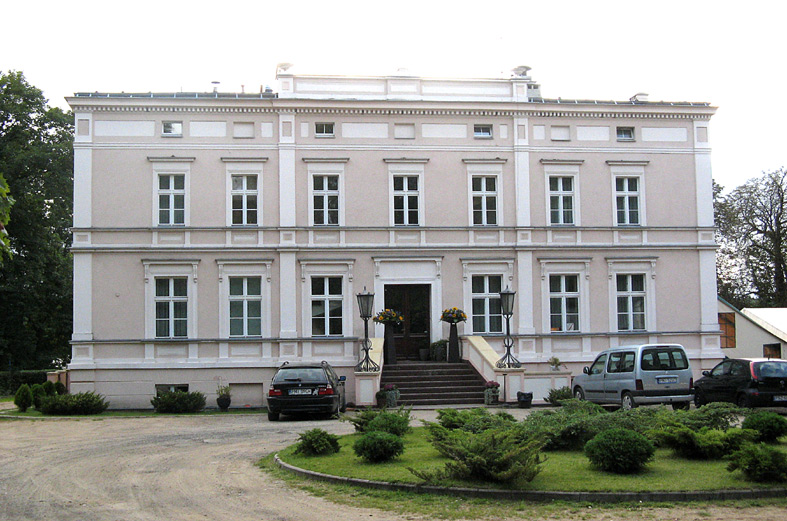

- Location within Poland
- Coordinates: 52°34′00″N 16°14′00″E
- Country: Poland
- Voivodeship: Greater Poland
- County: Międzychód
- Gmina: Chrzypsko Wielkie

Białokosz [bjaˈwɔkɔʂ] is a village in the administrative district of Gmina Chrzypsko Wielkie, within Międzychód County, Greater Poland Voivodeship, in west-central Poland.
