= Jean-Antoine-Siméon Fort =

French painter

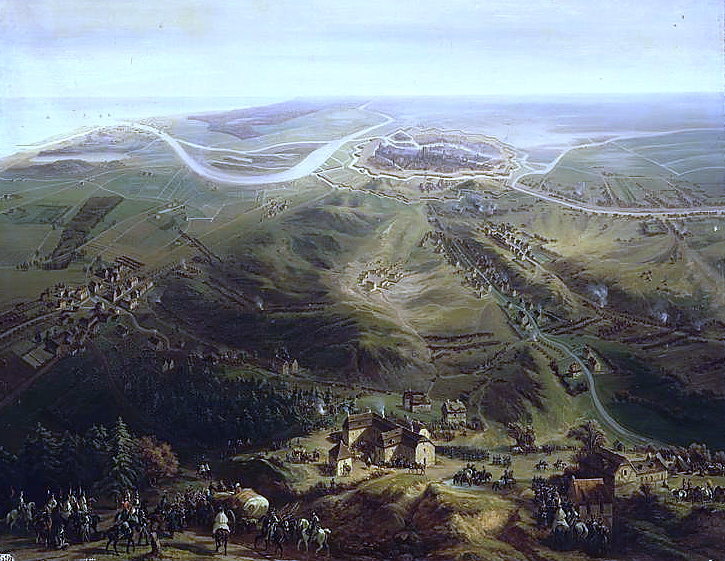
Panoramic view of the siege of Gdańsk by French forces in 1807 by Jean-Antoine-Siméon Fort

Jean-Antoine-Siméon Fort (28 August 1793 – 24 December 1861) was a French artist who painted in both oil and water colours. The French King Louis-Philippe commissioned several of his works.

== Biography ==
Fort was a student of the landscape painter Christian Brune. In 1842, Fort exhibited four canvases of battles and sieges at the Salon. They had been ordered by King Louis-Philippe for the "musée historique de Versailles". In the following year, he was commissioned to produce a view of the royal residence (View of the Palace of Compiègne (1843)).
