= Timeline of Lübeck =

Coordinates: 53.869722°N 10.686389°E

The following is a timeline of the history of the city of Lübeck, Schleswig-Holstein, Germany.

== Prior to 13th century ==
- 1138 – Town sacked.
- 1143 – New town founded by Adolf II of Holstein near site of old town.
- 1158 – Town ceded by Adolf II of Holstein to Duke Henry the Lion of Saxony.
- 1160 – Seat of Catholic diocese of Lübeck relocated to Lübeck from Oldenburg in Holstein.
- 1173 – Lübeck Cathedral construction begins.
- 1177 – Benedictine St.-Johannis-Kloster (Lübeck) founded.
- 1188 – Town charter issued by Henry the Lion.

== 13th–15th centuries ==
- 1201 – Danes in power.
- 1210 – Lübeck Cathedral construction completed (approximate date).
- 1226 – Lübeck becomes an Imperial Free City.
- 1250 – Petrikirche (Lübeck) (church) built.
- 1310 – Marienkirche (church) built (approximate date).
- 1312 – Heiligen-Geist-Hospital (Lübeck) founded.
- 1356 – St. Catherine's Church built (approximate date).
- 1368 – Hanseatic League adopts Lübeck's city seal.
- 1379 – Circle Company founded.
- 1408 – Uprising.
- 1420 - Paper mill established.
- 1442 – Lübeck Town Hall built.
- 1444 – Burgtor (city gate) built.
- 1450 – Merchants Company founded (approximate date).
- 1462 – Hinrich Castorp becomes mayor.
- 1463 – Bernt Notke creates Dance of Death artwork for the Marienkirche.
- 1475 - Printing press in operation.
- 1477
  - Crucifix created by Bernt Notke erected in Lübeck Cathedral.
  - Holstentor (city gate) built.
- 1491 – Artist Hans Memling creates triptych for the Lübeck Cathedral.

== 16th–18th centuries ==
- 1515 – St. Anne's Priory built.
- 1530 – Protestant Reformation.
- 1531 – Katharineum (school) opens.
- 1533 – Jürgen Wullenwever becomes mayor.
- 1535 – Shipowners' Guild house built.
- 1586 – Outer Holstentor (city gate) built.
- 1630 – Last Hanseatic Diet meets at Lübeck.
- 1668 – Dieterich Buxtehude becomes organist at the Marienkirche.
- 1697 – Buthman's Bierstube (tavern) in business.
- 1793 – Gesellschaft zur Beförderung gemeinnütziger Tätigkeit (charitable society) established.

== 19th century ==
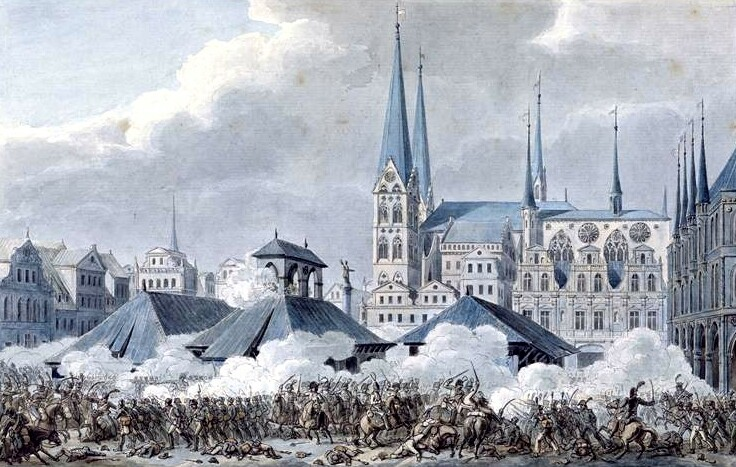
Battle of Lübeck

- 1801 – City "temporarily occupied" by Danes.
- 1802 – Town walls dismantled.
- 1806 – 6 November: City captured by French forces.
- 1810 – 12 November: City becomes part of the French Empire.
- 1813 – French occupation ends.
- 1815
  - Recognized as a free city by the Congress of Vienna.
  - Joins the German Confederation.
- 1825 – Navigation School founded.
- 1832 – Lübecker General-Anzeiger newspaper begins publication.
- 1835 – Lübeckische Blätter (newspaper) in publication.
- 1851 – Population: town 26,093; territory 54,166.
- 1857 - Population: town 30,717; territory 49,324.
- 1866 – Joins the North German Confederation.
- 1867 – Wilhelm-Theater opens.
- 1868
  - Joins the German Customs Union.
  - Schiffergesellschaft (restaurant) in operation.
- 1871 – Joins the German Empire.
- 1874 – Aegidienkirche (Lübeck) (church) restored.
- 1875 – Population: 44,799.
- 1890 – Population: town 63,590; territory 76,485.
- 1891 – Sacred Heart Church consecrated.
- 1893 – Museum am Dom (Lübeck) built.
- 1900 – Elbe-Trave canal opens.

== 20th century ==
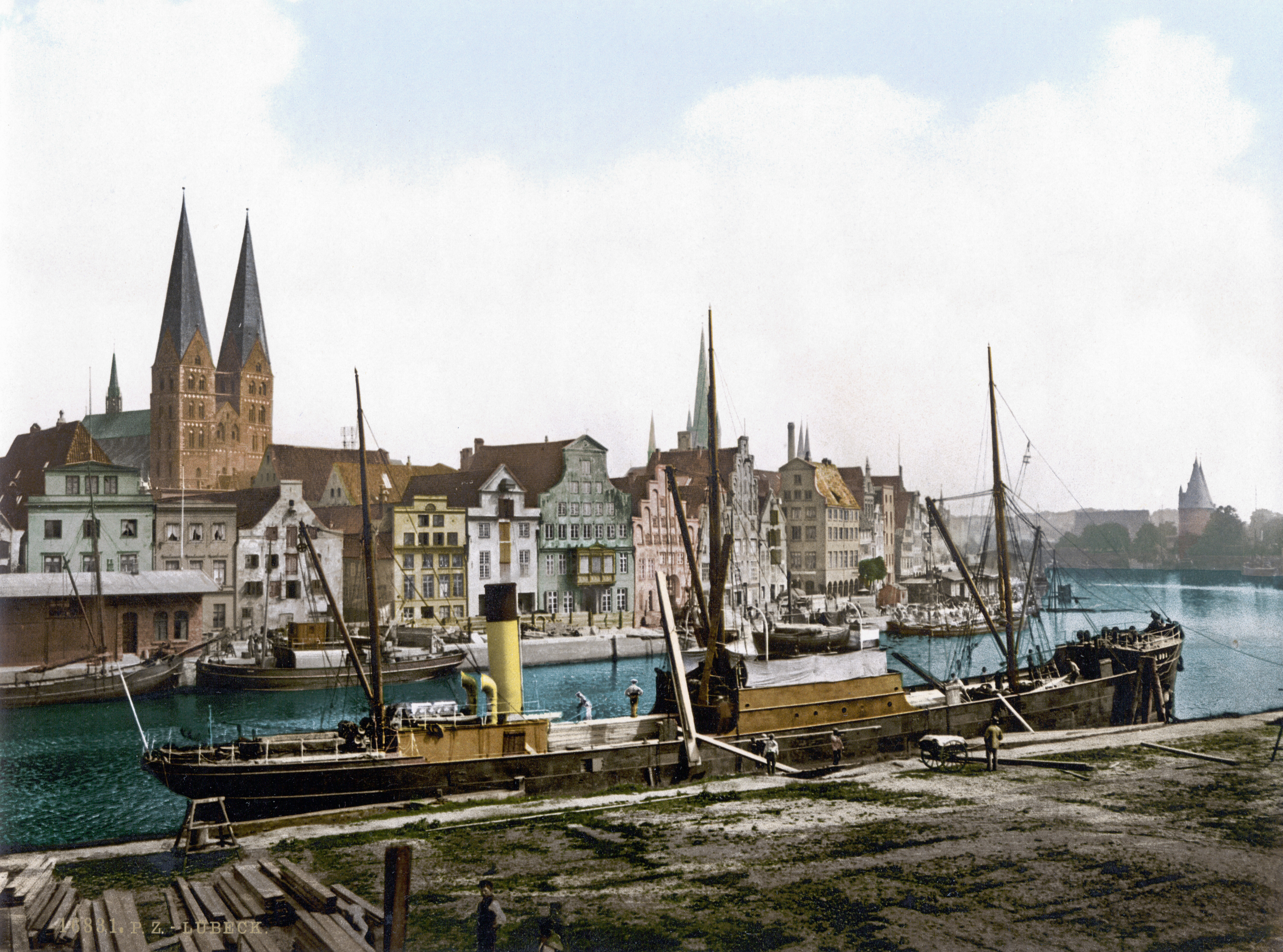
Lübeck at the turn of the 19th and 20th centuries

- 1904 – City Theatre opens.
- 1905 – Population: town 91,541; state 105,857.
- 1915 – St. Anne's Museum opens.
- 1917 – Lübeck Airport constructed.
- 1919
  - Lübeck joins the Weimar Republic.
  - Ballsportverein Vorwärts Lübeck (sport club) formed.
  - Population: town 113,071.
- 1921 – Sportvereinigung Polizei Lübeck (sport club) formed.
- 1924 – Stadion an der Lohmühle (stadium) opens.
- 1937 – The Greater Hamburg Act merges Lübeck into the Prussian Province of Schleswig-Holstein and it loses its status as an independent free city.
- 1940 – Oflag X-C prisoner-of-war camp for Allied officers established.
- 1942 – Bombing of Lübeck in World War II.
- 1945
  - 2 May: City captured by British forces. Oflag X-C POW camp liberated.
  - VfB Lübeck sport club formed.
- 1946 - Lübecker Nachrichten and Lübecker Freie Presse newspapers begin publication.
- 1948 – Lübecker Kantorei (choir) founded.
- 1973 – Lübeck Academy of Music founded.
- 1982
  - Lübeck Museum of Theatre Puppets established.
  - Lübeck Cathedral reconstructed.
- 1987 – City centre becomes a UNESCO World Heritage Site.
- 2000 – Bernd Saxe becomes mayor.

== 21st century ==
- 2001 – International School of New Media established.
- 2005 – Herren Tunnel opens.
- 2012 – Population: 211,713.

== See also ==
- Lübeck history
- History of Lübeck (includes timeline)
- List of mayors of Lübeck

== Bibliography ==
=== in English ===
- Thomas Nugent (1749), "Lübeck", The Grand Tour, vol. 2: Germany and Holland, London: S. Birt, hdl:2027/mdp.39015030762572
- David Brewster, ed. (1830). "Lübeck". Edinburgh Encyclopædia. Edinburgh: William Blackwood.
- "Lübeck", Leigh's New Descriptive Road Book of Germany, London: Leigh and Son, 1837
- Robert Baird (1842), "Lübeck", Visit to Northern Europe, New York: John S. Taylor & Co., OCLC 8052123
- Charles Knight, ed. (1866). "Lübeck". Geography. English Cyclopaedia. Vol. 3. London: Bradbury, Evans, & Co. hdl:2027/nyp.33433000064802.
- George Henry Townsend (1867), "Lübeck", A Manual of Dates (2nd ed.), London: Frederick Warne & Co.
- "Lübeck". Handbook for North Germany. London: J. Murray. 1877.
- John Lalor, ed. (1883). "Lübeck". Cyclopaedia of Political Science. Chicago.
- "Lübeck", Bradshaw's Illustrated Hand-book to Germany and Austria, London: W.J. Adams & Sons, 1896
- "Lübeck". Chambers's Encyclopaedia. London. 1901.
- "Lübeck", Northern Germany (15th ed.), Leipzig: Karl Baedeker, 1910, OCLC 78390379
- Pauli, Reinhold; Ashworth, Philip Arthur (1911). "Lübeck" . In Chisholm, Hugh (ed.). Encyclopædia Britannica. Vol. 17 (11th ed.). Cambridge University Press. pp. 85–87.
- Joseph Lins (1913). "Lübeck". Catholic Encyclopedia. NY.
- Wilson King (1914), Chronicles of Three Free Cities: Hamburg Bremen, Lübeck, London: Dent, OL 6568866M
- Eckehard Simon (1993). "Organizing and Staging Carnival Plays in Late Medieval Lübeck: A New Look at the Archival Record". Journal of English and Germanic Philology. 92 (1): 57–72. JSTOR 27710764.
- John M. Jeep, ed. (2001). "Lubeck". Medieval Germany: an Encyclopedia. Garland Publishing. ISBN 0-8240-7644-3.
- "Lübeck's Spires, a Quick Hop From Hamburg". New York Times. 5 August 2011.

=== in German ===
- Zeiller, Martin (1653). "Lübeck". Topographia Saxoniae Inferioris. Topographia Germaniae (in German). Frankfurt. p. 154+.
- Ernst Deecke (1881), Die freie und Hanse-Stadt Lübeck (in German) (4th ed.)
- Lübeck. Die Chroniken der deutschen Städte (in German). Vol. 19, 26, 28, 30–31. Leipzig: S. Hirzel Verlag. 1884–1911 – via HathiTrust.
- Max Hoffmann (1889–1892). Geschichte der Freien und Hansestadt Lübeck (in German).
- Ernst Deecke (1891), Lübische Geschichten und Sagen (in German)
- Karl von Hegel (1891). "Lübeck". Städte und Gilden der germanischen Völker im Mittelalter (in German). Vol. 2. Leipzig: Duncker & Humblot. hdl:2027/wu.89094689700 – via HathiTrust.
- Fritz Hirsch (1906). Die Petrikirche. Bau- und Kunstdenkmäler der Freien und Hansestadt Lübeck (Architecture and monuments of the Hanseatic City of Lübeck) (in German). Vol. 2. Lübeck: Bernhard Nöhring.
- Max Hoffmann (1908). Chronik der Stadt Lübeck (in German). Lübcke & Nöring.
- P. Krauss und E. Uetrecht, ed. (1913). "Lübeck". Meyers Deutscher Städteatlas [Meyer's Atlas of German Cities] (in German). Leipzig: Bibliographisches Institut.
- Lübeck, Deutscher Städteatlas (in German), vol. 3, Institut für vergleichende Städtegeschichte, 1984, ISBN 3891150008
- Wolfgang Adam; Siegrid Westphal, eds. (2012). "Lubeck". Handbuch kultureller Zentren der Frühen Neuzeit: Städte und Residenzen im alten deutschen Sprachraum (in German). De Gruyter. pp. 1299+. ISBN 978-3-11-029555-9.
