= Battle of Lübeck =

1806 battle during the War of the Fourth Coalition

- Part of the War of the Fourth Coalition and the Franco-Swedish War
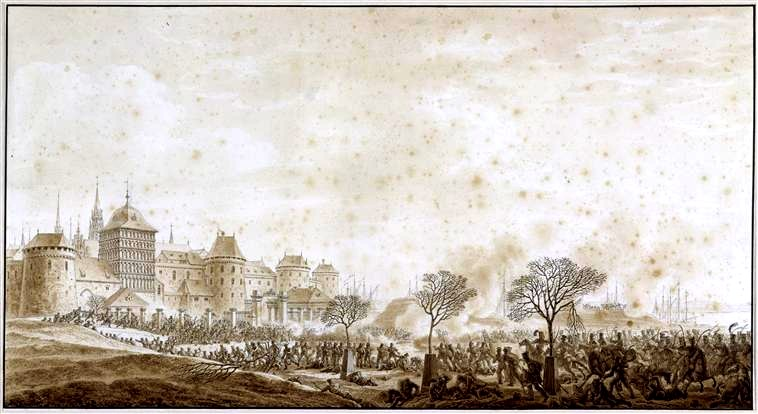
- Prussian and French troops fighting in front of the Burgtor, drawing by Benjamin Zix (1806)
Date	6 November 1806
Location	Lübeck, Germany 53°52′11″N 10°41′11″E
Result	French victory

Belligerents
(First French Empire) France	(Kingdom of Prussia) Prussia; Kingdom of Sweden	(Denmark–Norway) Denmark-Norway

Commanders and leaders
(First French Empire) Jean-Baptiste Bernadotte (First French Empire) Joachim Murat (First French Empire) Jean-de-Dieu Soult	(Kingdom of Prussia) Gebhard Leberecht von Blücher (surrendered)	(Denmark–Norway) Johann Ewald

Strength
30,000–35,000; 90 guns	Prussia: 17,000; 52 guns Sweden: 1,800; Total: 15,000–18,800; 52 guns	N/A

Casualties and losses
1,500–2,000 killed, wounded or captured	6,000–9,000 killed, wounded or captured 9,000 surrender on 7 November	None
- Location within Europe

War of the Fourth Coalition
⬤ current battle
⬤ Napoleon not in command
⬤ Napoleon in command

The Battle of Lübeck took place on 6 November 1806 in Lübeck, Germany between soldiers of the Kingdom of Prussia led by Gebhard Leberecht von Blücher, who were retreating from defeat at the Battle of Jena–Auerstedt, and troops of the First French Empire under Marshals Murat, Bernadotte, and Soult, who were pursuing them. In this War of the Fourth Coalition action, the French inflicted a severe defeat on the Prussians, driving them from the neutral city. Lübeck is an old Baltic Sea port approximately 50 kilometres (31 mi) northeast of Hamburg.

After their shattering defeat in October by Napoleon at the Battle of Jena–Auerstedt, the Prussian armies withdrew to the east bank of the Elbe River north of Magdeburg, then marched northeast, in an attempt to reach the Oder River. Aiming to annihilate his opponents' forces, Napoleon launched his Grande Armée in a headlong pursuit. A large portion of the fleeing Prussians took refuge in the fortress of Magdeburg where they were surrounded and besieged by Ney's VI Corps. Another large segment was intercepted and destroyed in the Battle of Prenzlau by Murat. This event triggered a series of capitulations of Prussian troops and fortresses.

Blocked from reaching the Oder after Hohenlohe's surrender at Prenzlau, Blücher turned and raced to the west, chased by Murat, Bernadotte, and Soult. After a number of well-fought rear guard actions, Blücher's troops forced their way into the neutral city of Lübeck, where they took up defensive positions. Bernadotte's soldiers broke through the city's northern defenses and overwhelmed the troops facing Murat and Soult. Blücher barely escaped from the city, though most of his staff was captured and Prussian casualties were enormous. The French brutally sacked Lübeck during and after the fighting. The next day, the French trapped the surviving Prussians against the Danish frontier and compelled Blücher to surrender.

Danish forces commanded by Johann Ewald were also mobilized and deployed at the nearby Danish-Prussian border with the purpose of preventing any French or Prussian forces from entering their territory (the original Prussian plan was to flee from the coming French to Denmark), as well as being ordered to protect Danish neutrality by force, if necessary; however, the Danish forces did not take any significant part in the armed struggle save for a few minor skirmishes and negotiations with both the Prussian and the French, although during these Ewald himself was briefly detained by the French.

The French captured a small Swedish force during the battle. Bernadotte's courteous and respectful treatment of its officers and soldiers would in part lead to the kingdom offering its crown to the French marshal, almost four years after this battle.

== Background ==
=== Jena-Auerstedt to Prenzlau ===
On 14 October 1806, Napoleon crushed the Prussian field armies in the Battle of Jena-Auerstedt. In the chaos after the debacle, the shattered remains of what had been three Prussian controlled armies coalesced into several major elements. General of Infantry Frederick Louis, Prince of Hohenlohe-Ingelfingen took command of one column that retreated through the Harz Mountains. General-Leutnant Blücher and General of Infantry Friedrich Adolf, Count von Kalckreuth, followed in Hohenlohe's wake with a 12,000-man column. These forces were trailed by 12,000 troops under General Karl August, Grand Duke of Saxe-Weimar-Eisenach and General-Leutnant Christian Ludwig von Winning. The last-named corps missed Jena-Auerstedt. Meanwhile, the Prince of Orange surrendered at least 10,000 Prussians to Marshal Murat's Cavalry Corps in the Capitulation of Erfurt on 16 October.

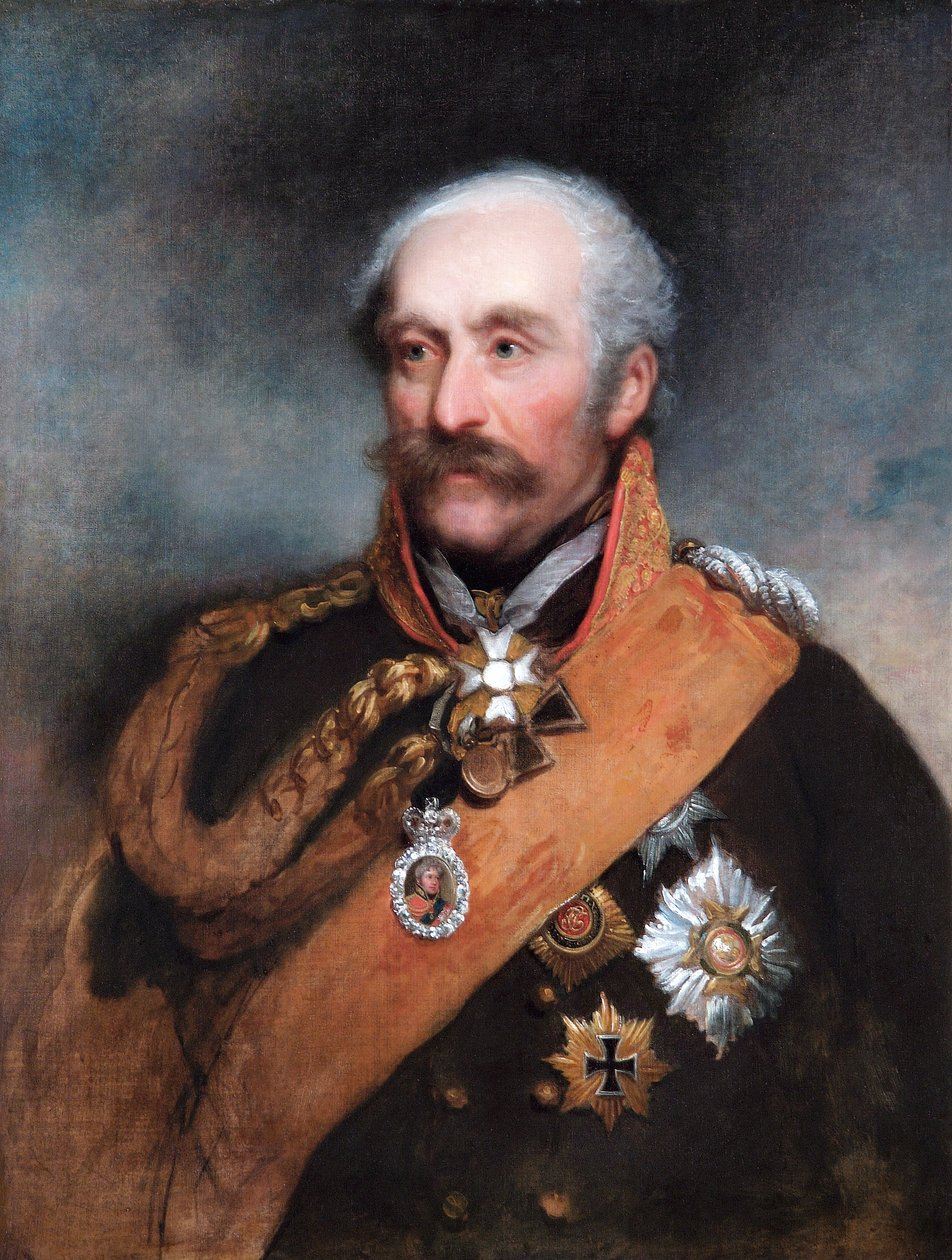
Gebhard von Blücher

The 16,000 fresh troops of the Prussian Reserve, commanded by Eugene Frederick Henry, Duke of Württemberg, had remained at Halle since the 13th. On 17 October, the 20,600 men of Marshal Bernadotte's I Corps mauled Württemberg's force in the Battle of Halle. The Reserve retreated to Magdeburg where it joined Hohenlohe on 20 October. Marshal Soult with the IV Corps and Murat's cavalry reached the outskirts of the city that day and demanded Hohenlohe's surrender, which he refused. On the 22nd, Soult and Marshal Michel Ney's VI Corps invested the fortress on the west bank of the Elbe. After leaving what was intended to be 9,000, but thanks to miscommunication amongst the Prussians proved to be over 20,000 additional troops to man the fortress, Hohenlohe marched to the northeast via Burg bei Magdeburg. He was soon joined by Kalckreuth who crossed the Elbe to the north at Tangermünde.

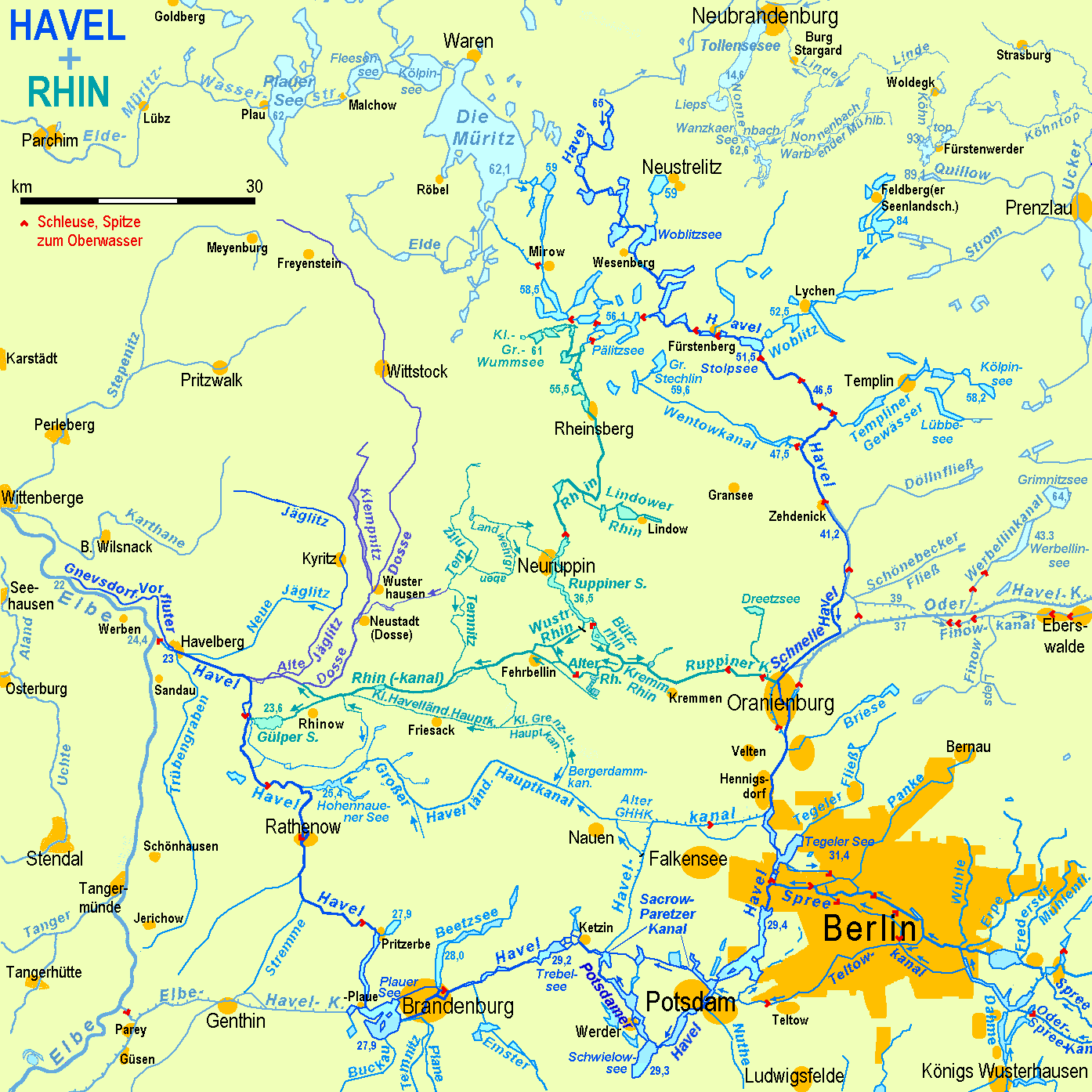
Havel River and nearby canal network

As Hohenlohe was manoeuvring north to Neustadt an der Dosse, Blücher moved northeast from Nordhausen, through the Harz Mountains, past Braunschweig, and boated across the Elbe at Sandau on 24 October. Similarly, Saxe-Weimar marched from Bad Langensalza to Mühlhausen, and on to Osterode. After feinting at Magdeburg to trick Soult, he successfully reached the Elbe at Sandau too. Oberst Ludwig Yorck von Wartenburg conducted a skillful action at Altenzaun on the afternoon and evening of the 26th, the Prussian rear guard holding off Soult's advance guard until Saxe-Weimar's troops safely reached the east bank, then Yorck also slipped away. At this time, Winning took over command of the column from Saxe-Weimar.

Hohenlohe reached Neustadt an der Dosse on the evening of 24 October. After he crossed the Elbe, Blücher accepted command of Hohenlohe's rear guard. There was a network of canals, along with the Havel River, that ran east and west roughly between the Elbe and Oder. Hohenlohe planned to send General-Major Christian Ludwig Schimmelpfennig von der Oye with a flying column to protect his right flank by destroying all the bridges along this stretch of water.

By nightfall on 25 October, Hohenlohe's main body was between Neuruppin and Lindow, a little farther east. General-Major von Schwerin's cavalry and Oberst von Hagen's infantry brigade marched toward Wittstock. General-Major Rudolf Ernst Christoph von Bila reached Kyritz, north of Neustadt, with a cavalry-infantry brigade. Blücher's rear guard was near Neustadt, after a clash with Bernadotte's leading troops. In an ominous development, French cavalry seized Oranienburg before Schimmelpfennig arrived there.

On 26 October, Murat routed Schimmelpfennig's column at Zehdenick, sending the Prussians fleeing to Stettin after losing more than 250 cavalry from their 1,300-man force. The next day, in confused fighting at Boitzenburg, Hohenlohe overcame a French road block and pressed on to the east after losing a cavalry regiment. On 28 October, Murat attacked the Prussians in the Battle of Prenzlau. One of General of Division Emmanuel Grouchy's dragoon brigades hewed a path through Hohenlohe's column. General of Division Marc Antoine de Beaumont and his 3rd Dragoon Division pounced on the now-isolated rear guard under Oberst Prince Augustus of Prussia, forcing it to surrender. Murat then succeeded in bluffing Hohenlohe into capitulating, even though the Prussian was neither surrounded nor outnumbered. Not including 2,000 previous losses, about 10,000 soldiers, 64 guns, and 1,800 cavalry horses fell into the hands of the French.

=== Prenzlau to Lübeck ===
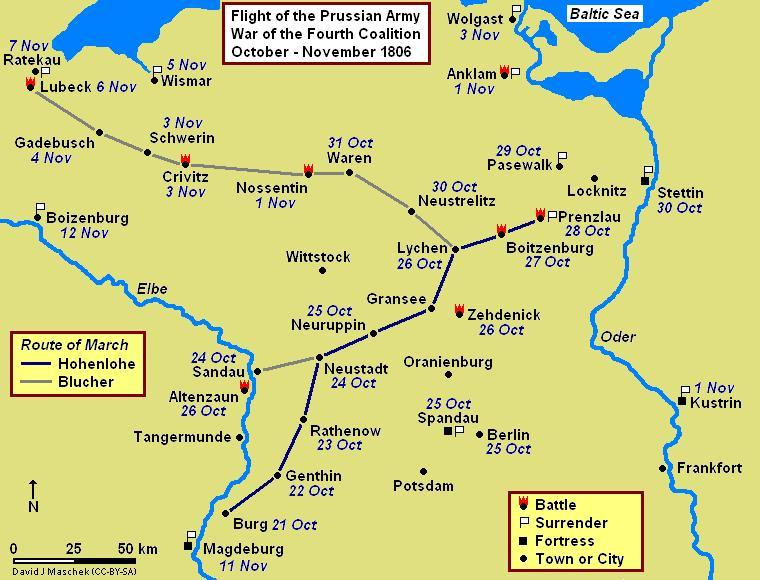
Prenzlau-Lübeck Campaign Map, showing routes of Hohenlohe and Blücher

The next day, 4,000 Prussians surrendered to two French light cavalry brigades in the Capitulation of Pasewalk. That night General of Brigade Antoine Lasalle and his light cavalry accepted the Capitulation of Stettin after bluffing the fortress commander into surrendering with over 5,000 troops. In the wake of these humiliating defeats, a number of smaller Prussian columns were mopped up. On 30 October, Major von Höpfner surrendered an artillery convoy with 600 soldiers, 25 guns, 48 wagons, and 800 horses at Boldekow south of Anklam. Bila, his older brother General-Major Karl Anton Ernst von Bila, and their 2,173 troops laid down their arms at Anklam to General of Division Nicolas Léonard Beker's dragoons on 1 November. Approximately 100 km to the east of Berlin, that day also saw the fortress of Küstrin capitulate to one of Marshal Louis Davout's III Corps brigades.

Leaving Ney to carry out the Siege of Magdeburg, Soult crossed the Elbe at Tangermünde and headed northeast. He reached Wusterhausen near Neustadt on 30 October, with his cavalry probing toward Wittstock. Farther to the east, Bernadotte captured a Prussian supply convoy and 20 field pieces on the 26th and reached Boitzenburg on the evening of 29 October. The next morning, finding that Blücher had veered northwest, Bernadotte marched toward Neustrelitz. Leading one of Bernadotte's cavalry regiments, Colonel Étienne Maurice Gérard captured 400 troops belonging to Blücher and reported that the Prussian was making for Waren.

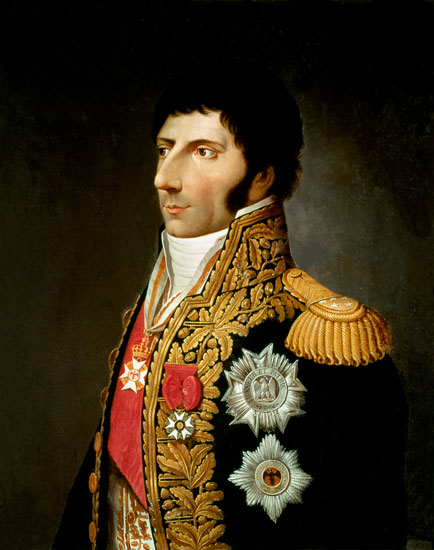
Jean-Baptiste Bernadotte

On 31 October, the columns of Blücher and Winning met near Waren. Winning wanted to escape to the port of Rostock to the north, and had already sent General-Major Karl Georg Friedrich von Wobeser ahead to organize the evacuation. However, Blücher overruled him and proceeded with his own strategy, which was to recross the Elbe at Boizenburg. From there, he planned to either join with General Karl Ludwig von Lecoq in the former Electorate of Hanover or Lieutenant General Franz Kasimir von Kleist at Magdeburg. Blücher reorganized his small army into two corps. Winning led the 11,000-strong I Corps, while Blücher commanded the 10,000-man II Corps. Each corps was subdivided into two heavy and one light divisions.

At this time, there were 47,252 Frenchmen hunting for Blücher. Bernadotte's I Corps numbered 15,450, Soult's IV Corps counted 24,375, and from Murat's Cavalry Reserve, General of Division Louis Michel Antoine Sahuc led 2,550 dragoons, Grouchy another 2,432 dragoons in his division, Lasalle counted 785 light cavalry, and General of Division Jean-Joseph Ange d'Hautpoul led 1,660 cuirassiers. Bernadotte pressed ahead with 12,000 of his most fit troops, leaving the rest behind. Murat and his cavalry were rapidly moving west from their victories at Prenzlau and Stettin.

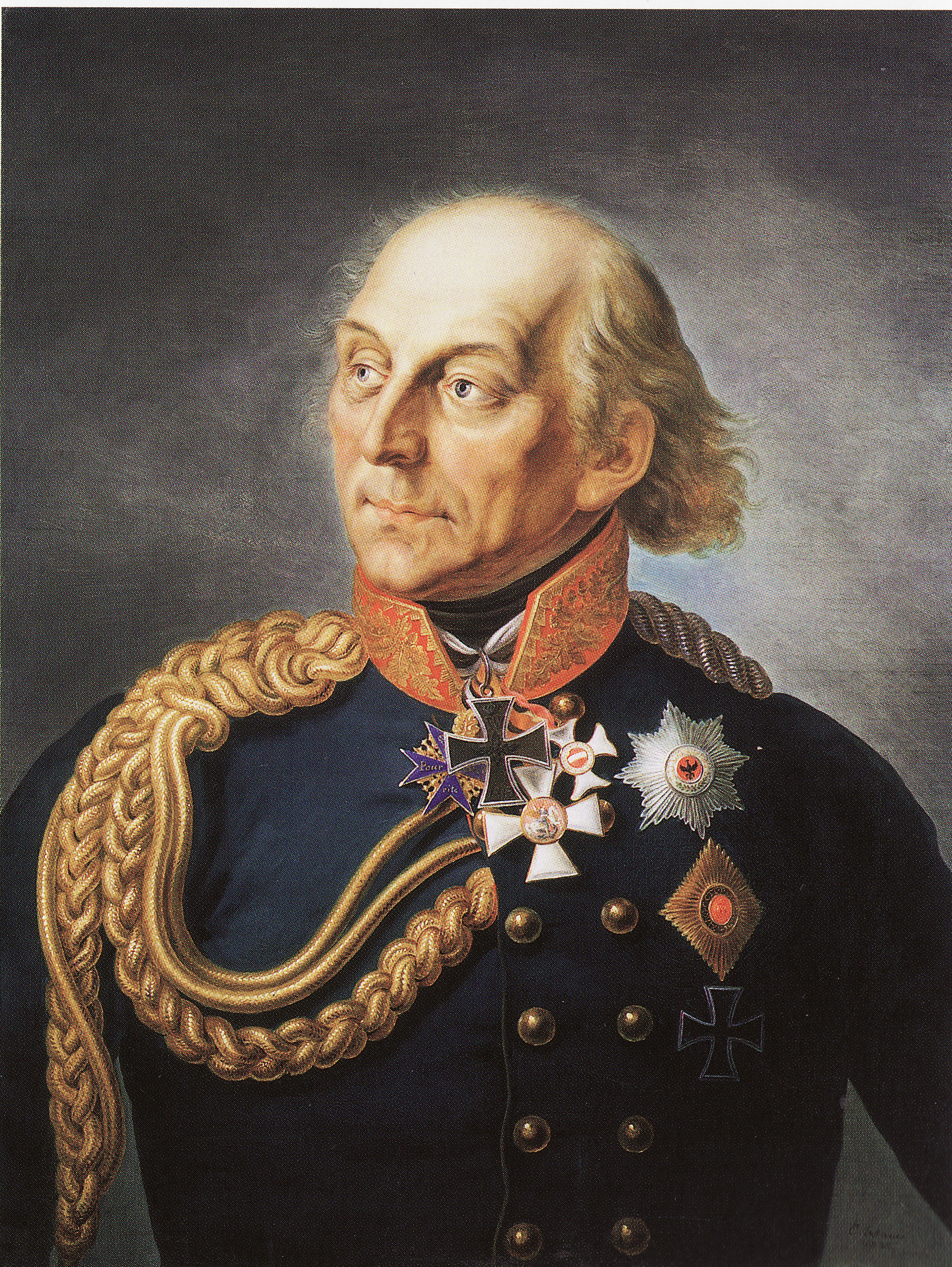
Ludwig Yorck

On the morning of 1 November, the Prussians evacuated Waren. Blücher moved to the northwest covered by a rear guard under General-Major Friedrich Gottlieb von Oswald. Winning marched due west covered by Oberst August Wilhelm von Pletz's rear guard. That morning the Prussians brawled near Waren with both Soult's and Bernadotte's light cavalry brigades, plus General of Division Anne Jean Marie René Savary's 1st Hussar and 7th Chasseurs à Cheval Regiments, before falling back to the west. Under Yorck's tactical direction the three Prussian fusilier battalions, six Jäger companies, and 20 squadrons of hussars gave a good account of themselves in the battle of Waren-Nossentin. Though Bernadotte committed General of Division Jean-Baptiste Drouet, Comte d'Erlon's dragoon division to the capture of Nossentin village, Yorck and Pletz drew off in good order to Alt Schwerin that night.

On the morning of 2 November, Sahuc's 4th Dragoon Division set out from Rathenow and Murat left Demmin (west of Anklam) sweeping west with Lasalle (light cavalry), Grouchy (dragoons), and d'Hautpoul (cuirassiers). Bernadotte was at Nossentin, whilst Soult was further east, at Waren. That day, near Granzin, Drouet's division (of Bernadotte's I Corps) caught up with the 500 men of the 2nd battalion of the Tschammer Infantry Regiment Nr. 27, inflicting a loss of one cannon and 57 casualties, including Major Puttkammer captured. Away to the northeast on 2 and 3 November, the port of Wolgast surrendered to the 22nd Dragoon Regiment of General of Brigade André Joseph Boussart's brigade (Grouchy's division). Hohenlohe's baggage train with 2,500 mostly non-combatants thus fell into the hands of Grouchy's division.

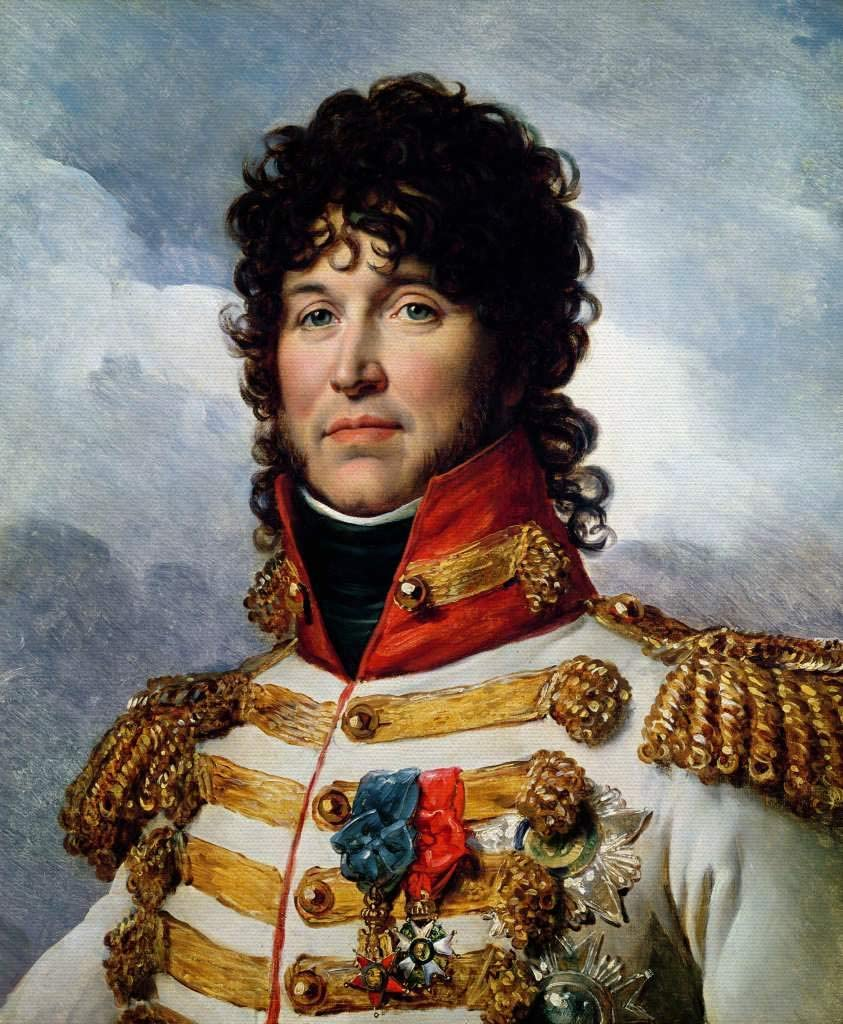
Joachim Murat

Oswald's rear guard made a stand at Crivitz on 3 November in an action called a Prussian victory. The Prussian led the Fusilier battalions Greiffenberg Nr. 4, Knorr Nr. 12, and Oswald Nr. 16, the Grenadier battalions Schmeling and Vieregg, and the Hahn horse artillery battery Nr. 5. His cavalry units were the Hertzberg Dragoon Regiment Nr. 9, five squadrons, and the Rudorff Hussar Regiment Nr. 2, five squadrons. In total there were about 2,500-3,000 infantry and 1200-1500 cavalry, with 8 guns.

The French foot soldiers were part of an advance guard of Bernadotte's I Corps. Generals of Brigade Michel Marie Pacthod led the 8th Line, and Nicolas Joseph Maison the 27th Light and 94th Line Infantry Regiments. These were supported by the 2nd and 4th Hussar, and 5th Chasseur à Cheval Regiments under General of Brigade Pierre Watier (who had temporarily replaced Jacques Louis François Delaistre de Tilly), plus one horse and one foot artillery battery. All told, there were 6,500 Frenchmen and 12 guns, including 750-1,000 horsemen.

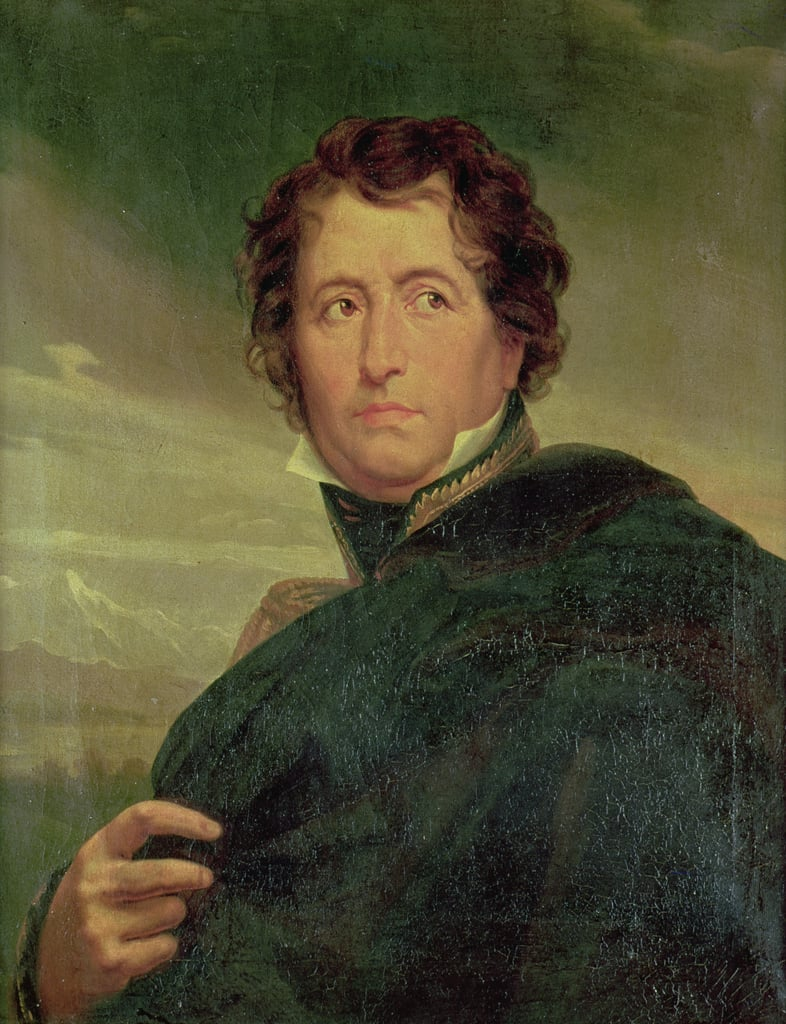
Nicolas Soult

Maison drove Oswald's troops out of Crivitz after a tough fight. At first, the Prussians fell back to high ground behind the village, then continued their retreat. General of Brigade Pierre Watier galloped forward from the village with the light cavalry. Watier summoned the Prussians to surrender, but their response was a charge by the Rudorff hussars. The French horsemen unwisely opened fire with their carbines and were swept away by Oswald's counterattack. Aide de Camp Colonel Gérard was captured and Bernadotte had to take shelter inside of an infantry square. The hussars were finally halted by Pacthod's infantry. Later that evening, Soult's cavalry joined Bernadotte's forces and the French were able to seize the village of Meuss near Schwerin. During the action, the French cut off and wiped out the 1st battalion of the Arnim Infantry Regiment Nr. 13 at Pinnow.

By 4 November Sahuc and Murat had nearly caught up with Soult and Bernadotte. Meanwhile, after receiving a false report that Soult was between him and Boizenburg, Blücher decided to fall back from Schwerin to Gadebusch, site of a battle in 1712. On the 4th, Oberst Christian Friedrich von der Osten with a dragoon regiment, a fusilier battalion, and one company of Jägers joined Blücher from Lecoq's corps at Hameln. Wobeser also rejoined with his column. On the 5th, Savary's two regiments caught up with another stray Prussian force under General-Major Friedrich Leopold Karl Bernhard von Usedom at the port of Wismar. The Frenchman claimed that he captured 700 cavalry, while the Prussians admitted surrendering 367 troopers. The Prussians belonged to the Usedom Hussar Regiment Nr. 10 and part of Blücher's wagon train under Major Panwitz.

By this time, Blücher's force was reduced to around 16,000 to 17,000 soldiers. Though he possessed 100 artillery pieces and the Gadebusch position was strong, the Prussian declined battle because his troops were hungry and worn out by constant marching. He decided to fall back to the Hanseatic city-state of Lübeck, where he hoped to join a force of Swedes that he knew were in the area. The Prussian army appeared before neutral Lübeck on the morning of 5 November. At midday, they forced their way through the southern gate and occupied the city. Addressing the city senate in the Rathaus, Blücher demanded large amounts of food, drink, fodder, and currency for his army, but promised not to fight in the city.

Meanwhile, a brigade of 1,800 Swedes had entered Lübeck on 31 October, hoping to secure transport vessels to carry them home. When they finally boarded ship on the 4th, they found themselves trapped in the Trave River by contrary winds. Aiming to capture the Swedes, Bernadotte sent one battalion to the mouth of the Trave and another detachment under Maison to Schlutup, which is on the Trave downstream from the city. Also on the 5th, Soult attacked one of Blücher's rear guards under General-Major Karl Gerhard von Pelet at Roggendorf, driving it away to the south of Lübeck. Soult pressed on and captured 300 Prussians at Ratzeburg. He and Murat were now poised to advance on Lübeck from the south. As these events unfolded, a Danish force commanded by Lieutenant General Johann Ewald marched toward Stockelsdorf. Ewald notified Blücher that he was prepared to defend his nation's neutrality by force.

== Battle ==
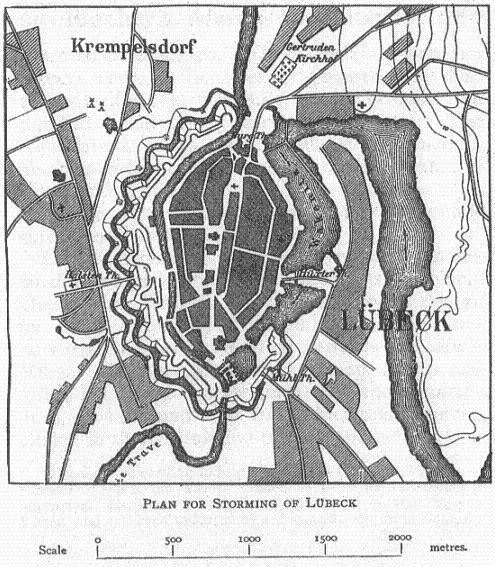
Map showing Lübeck's fortifications in 1806

Most of Blücher's army spent the night in Lübeck. To protect his south flank, the Prussian general posted a dragoon regiment and half of a horse artillery battery at Moisling. General-Major Balthasar Wilhelm Christoph von (Jung-)Larisch with the 2nd Division of II Corps guarded the Trave north of the city. Blücher's rearguard under Oswald remained outside the northern gate, while a regiment of hussars stayed outside the southern gate.

Lübeck was once heavily fortified, but by 1806 its defenses were partially dismantled. Nevertheless, the wet ditches in front of its old walls presented a serious obstacle to an attacker. East of the Trave, there were three gates into the city. The northern gate, known as the Burgtor, overlooked a narrow strip of land between the Trave and Wakenitz Rivers. The southern gate was called the Mühlentor (Mills Gate) and the eastern gate was named the Hüxtertor. On the west bank of the Trave, there was only one gate, the Holstentor. The Wakenitz protected much of the eastern side of the town.

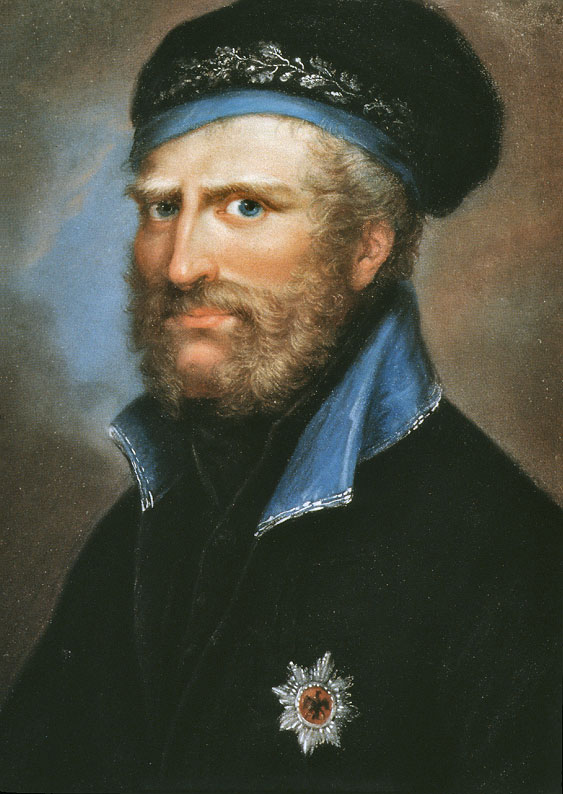
Duke of Brunswick

At the Burgtor, Blücher packed eight guns into a semicircular fortification in front of the gate and added two more cannons near the gate. He placed four more guns on the Bellevue bastion on the west bank in order to take any attackers under a crossfire. In addition to Oswald's rear guard, other infantry were available to defend the position. Blücher put the Burgtor sector under the command of General-Major Frederick William, Duke of Brunswick-Wolfenbüttel. He defended the Mühlentor with four or five battalions, plus a 6-pounder battery. The Hoxtertor was held by an infantry regiment, two horse artillery guns, and four regimental pieces. Other troops remained in reserve under General-Major Hans Christoph von Natzmer, so that a total of 17 battalions and 52 guns defended Lübeck. When a delegation of city fathers reminded Blücher of his promise not to do battle in the city, the Prussian brushed them off, vowing that he would fight.

Natzmer's 1st Division included the Infantry Regiments Tschammer Nr. 27, Kauffberg Nr. 51, Natzmer Nr. 54, and Manstein Nr. 55, two battalions each, the Hertzberg Dragoon Regiment Nr. 9, five squadrons, one foot artillery battery, and half of a horse artillery battery. Larisch's 2nd Division contained the Infantry Regiments Kalckreuth Nr. 4, Owstein Nr. 7, and Jung-Larisch Nr. 53, two battalions each, the 2nd battalion of the Brunswick Infantry Regiment Nr. 21, the Heyking Dragoon Regiment Nr. 10, five squadrons, and a horse artillery battery. Oswald's command comprised ten squadrons of the Blücher Hussar Regiment Nr. 8, the Schmeling and Vieregg Grenadier battalions, elements of several fusilier battalions, and half of a horse artillery battery.

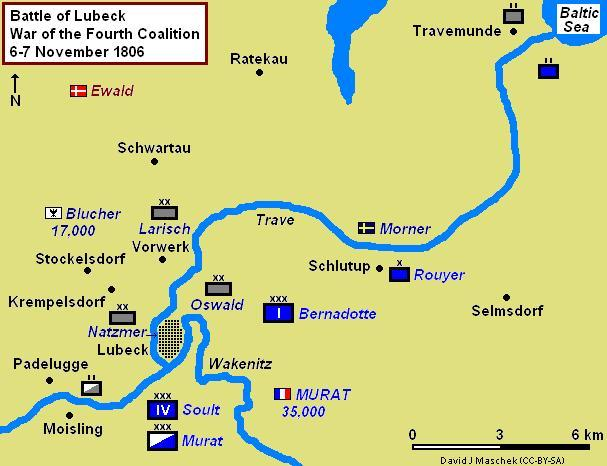
Map of the Battle of Lübeck on 6–7 November 1806, showing nearby towns

After beginning its march at 2:00 AM, Bernadotte's corps bumped into an enemy column at Selmsdorf, east of Lübeck. The French quickly enveloped the Prussian force, a convoy marching from Wismar, and secured the surrender of 1,000 troops and 300 wagons. Meanwhile, General of Brigade Marie François Rouyer intercepted some Swedish transports near Schlutup. After a brief cannonade, 600 Swedes surrendered.

Bernadotte's I Corps included Pierre Dupont de l'Etang's 1st Division, Rivaud's 2nd Division, Drouet's 3rd Division, Tilly's light cavalry, and General of Division Jean Baptiste Eblé's artillery reserve. Dupont had three battalions of the 9th Light Infantry and two battalions each of the 32nd and 96th Line Infantry Regiments. Rivaud's division and Tilly's brigade were the same as at the action of Crivitz (see above). Drouet's division contained the 27th Light Infantry and the 94th and 95th Line Infantry Regiments, a total of seven battalions. The artillery train included three foot and four horse artillery batteries.

Soult's IV Corps comprised three infantry divisions. General of Division Louis Vincent Le Blond de Saint-Hilaire's eight-battalion 1st Division included the 10th Light, 35th, 45th, and 55th Line Infantry Regiments. General of Division Jean François Leval's 10-battalion 2nd Division was made up of the 24th Light, 4th, 28th, 46th, and 57th Line Infantry Regiments. General of Division Claude Juste Alexandre Legrand's nine-battalion 3rd Division was composed of the 26th Light, 18th and 75th Line Infantry Regiments, along with the Tirailleurs Corses and Tirailleurs du Po, Italian units. Supporting corps units included General of Brigade Pierre Margaron's light cavalry brigade, consisting of the 8th Hussar Regiment, the 11th, 16th, and 22nd Chasseurs à Cheval Regiments, and eight foot and two horse artillery batteries.

At 6:00 AM, Murat, with Soult's cavalry and Lasalle's brigade, fell upon the Pletz Hussar Regiment Nr. 3 on the southern approaches, capturing 200 troopers and chasing them inside Lübeck. The guns defending the Mühlentor repulsed the pursuing French cavalry. Soult's corps and Sahuc's dragoons arrived and their artillery began pounding the Prussians at the southern gate.

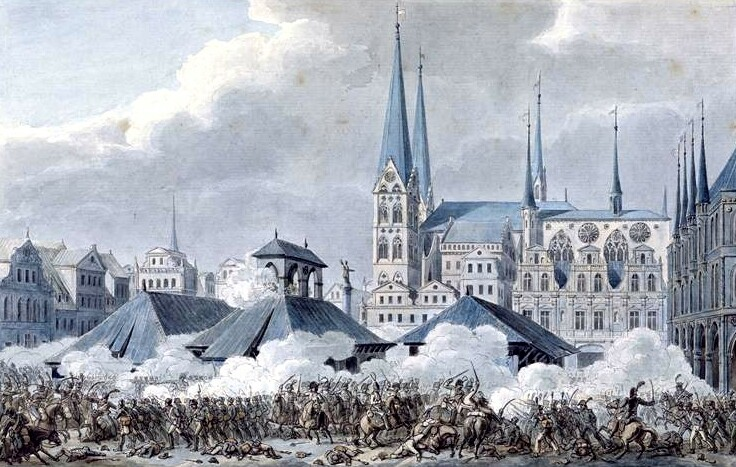
Battle of Lübeck, showing fighting in the market square with St. Mary's Church in the background

Soon after, Bernadotte's advance guard pushed Oswald's rear guard back toward the northern gate. Drouet's tirailleurs soon secured the Galgenburg, a hill east of the Burgtor, and cannons were massed on the height. Bernadotte deployed the division of Drouet on the left and Rivaud on the right, with Dupont supporting the right. General of Brigade François Werlé led the 27th Light Infantry Regiment of Drouet in the center against the St. Gertrude Church. At first, the French were stopped, but the commander of the Prussian battery was wounded and this lowered its effectiveness. A second effort carried the churchyard, but then Werlé's men were enfiladed by the Bellevue battery, which inflicted heavy losses. Drouet's 94th Line Infantry Regiment then rushed forward on the left. Meanwhile, Brunswick decided to supervise the battle from the Bellevue bastion, so he crossed to the Trave's west bank.

Undetected in the battle smoke, the 94th Line overran a small redoubt. Then the regiment stormed the semicircular position, seizing the entire battery. At about 1:00 PM, the Prussian defenders fled through the Burgtor, followed by the victorious French. Bernadotte directed Drouet to the right to take the bridge over the Trave, while sending Rivaud to the left to take the Mühlentor's defenders from the rear. Other French troops boated across the Trave and forced the Bellevue battery to withdraw.

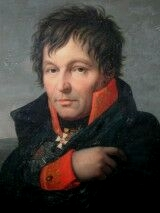
Gerhard von Scharnhorst

Believing his northern defenses secure, Blücher retired to his headquarters at the Golden Angel Inn near the Mühlentor. He was surprised there by Rivaud's skirmishers and barely escaped with his son and Karl Freiherr von Müffling, though his chief of staff, Gerhard von Scharnhorst and the rest of his staff became prisoners. Meanwhile, the French pushed through the market place and the Königstrasse amid vicious street fighting in which Yorck was wounded and many other Prussians were killed or wounded. At the head of a troop of cuirassiers, Blücher tried without success to rescue his staff. Then the group cut their way to the bridge over the Trave and safety.

Soult sent Leval to take the Hoxtertor, Legrand to attack the Mühlentor, while holding Saint-Hilaire in reserve. The Prussians defending the Mühlentor were taken in rear by Rivaud's division, though they fought back furiously. Hit by fire from all directions, the defenders sustained heavy losses, including 300 in one regiment alone. Finally, 2,000 Prussians surrendered and Murat's horsemen surged through the gate and into the streets. The next victims were the Hoxtertor's defenders, the Owstein Regiment. Engulfed by cavalry and infantry, the regiment formed an infantry square but was soon forced to surrender after suffering heavy losses. By 3:30 PM, the French firmly controlled Lübeck, though sporadic fighting continued.

Hearing the racket as the French stamped out resistance at the eastern and southern gates, Blücher tried to organize another attack. He sent the Kuhnheim Regiment Nr. 1 to attack the Holstentor, but Drouet's troops already occupied the bridge and the western defenses. The French repulsed the Prussians with heavy losses and forced them back to Bad Schwartau. French troops then emerged from the city in pursuit.

== Results ==
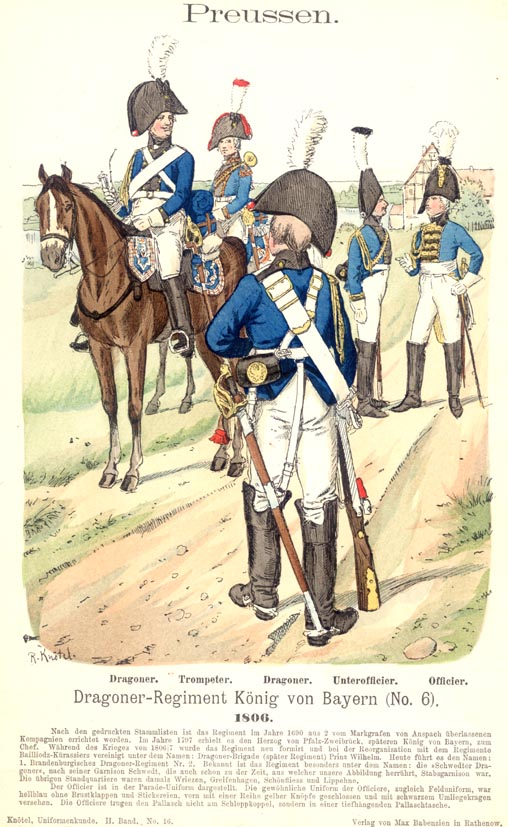
Prussian King of Bavaria Dragoons Nr. 1 in 1806

The French marshals estimated Prussian losses in Lübeck as 3,000 killed and wounded, plus 5,000 to 6,000 captured. Historian Digby Smith gave the Prussian losses at Lübeck as 2,000 killed and wounded, plus a further 4,000 captured out of 15,000 troops. The Infantry Regiments Owstein, Tschammer, and Natzmer were wiped out and 22 guns lost. The French employed between 30,000 and 35,000 men in the battle. In addition to 2,000 Prussians killed and wounded and 4,000 captured, French historian Alain Pigeard also noted that the Prussians and Swedes lost 24 flags, two standards and at least 50 artillery pieces. According to the same source, overall French losses amounted to 1,500 killed and wounded, including the IV Corps artillery chief, Colonel Pierre-Elisabeth Peytes de Montcabrié, who died on 8 November, following the wounds he had received two days earlier.

However, the French were not finished for the day. At Paddeluge, Soult's cavalry captured four infantry companies and two guns under Captain Witzleben. Grouchy's dragoons trotted through the city to capture Major Friedrich Albrecht Gotthilf von Ende's force before ending the day at Vorwerk.

At Krempelsdorf, Ende surrendered 360 men and four guns, including five squadrons of the Köhler Hussar Regiment Nr. 7, one squadron of the King of Bavaria Dragoon Regiment Nr. 1, and a half horse battery. The Bailliodz Cuirassier Regiment Nr. 5 laid down its weapons at Steckenitz. Smith credits Tilly's brigade with Ende's capture, while Petre credits Grouchy. At Schwartau that evening, Oberst Löben surrendered to Bernadotte with 1,500 troops. These included the Bila Fusilier battalion Nr. 2, the Kuhnheim, Jung-Larisch, and Manstein Infantry Regiments, plus the Osten Dragoon Regiment Nr. 12.

Having stormed the city, the French troops thoroughly plundered Lübeck amid cries of "pillage, rape, and murder." Bernadotte and other superior officers tried to restrain their men, with Bernadotte personally defending several houses using his saber, but the French soldiers ran completely amok. That the troops were guilty of atrocities was admitted by contemporary writers such as Antoine-Henri Jomini and Guillaume Mathieu, comte Dumas. Historian Francis Loraine Petre noted that Blücher's decision to fight a pitched battle in a neutral city made him at least partly culpable for the sack of Lübeck.

At daybreak, Blücher stood at Ratekau, north-northeast of Lübeck, with the remnant of his army. The Prussian general commanded only 4,050 infantry and 3,760 cavalry out of a force that had numbered 21,000 on 1 November. In his immediate front were three French marshals with as many as 35,000 soldiers. To his left was the Trave, to his rear was the Baltic Sea, and to his right was the Danish frontier, defended now by Ewald's force. Since resistance was obviously hopeless, Blücher requested terms and was told he must surrender his soldiers as prisoners of war. He dispatched a document that announced his surrender to Bernadotte and complained that he was out of food and ammunition. Murat refused to accept it, pointing out that the Prussians must capitulate to all three marshals and that stating his reason for surrendering was irregular. Blücher thereupon surrendered to Bernadotte, Soult, and Murat, though he was allowed to append a statement at the end of the document. He wrote,

"I capitulate, since I have neither bread nor ammunition - BLUCHER."

Pigeard stated that Blücher surrendered with a total of 8,000 to 9,000 men, with 80 artillery pieces, which constituted all that was left of his army corps. The Prussian foot units that lost flags (in parentheses) were the Infantry Regiments Kuhnheim Nr. 1 (4), Kalckreuth Nr. 4 (4), Alt-Larisch Nr. 26 (2), Borcke Nr. 30 (4), and Kauffberg Nr. 51 (4). The cavalry regiments losing standards were the Beeren Cuirassiers Nr. 2 (5), Katte Dragoons Nr. 4 (2), Königin Dragoons Nr. 5 (1), Hertzberg Dragoons Nr. 9 (5), Heyking Dragoons Nr. 10 (5), and Wobeser Dragoons Nr. 14 (1).

On 8 November, the Prussian detachment at Travemünde surrendered to Rivaud. Drouet was sent to the Lower Elbe to hunt down Pelet's force, which was included in the capitulation. When Drouet caught up with him, Pelet surrendered with 420 men and half of a horse artillery battery at Boizenburg on the 12th. Four squadrons of the King of Bavaria Dragoons and one squadron of the Köhler Hussars also laid down their arms.

Bernadotte first came to the notice of the Swedish authorities with his courteous treatment of the captured Colonel Count Gustav Mörner and his officers, who mainly hailed from the province of Östergötland. Bernadotte treated Count Mörner with the utmost courtesy, placing his own lodgings at the Count's disposal whilst a prisoner of the French. Marcellin Marbot, a hostile witness, wrote in his memoirs that Bernadotte, "was especially desirous to earn the character of a well-bred man in the eyes of these strangers." Mörner, and his nephew, Baron Karl Otto Mörner, later played a key part in the early stages of the process that eventually led to the 1810 election of Bernadotte as Crown Prince of Sweden by the Riksdag of the Estates and in 1818 ascended the throne as King Charles XIV John of Sweden.

== Notes ==
Preceded by Battle of Waren-Nossentin	Napoleonic Wars; Battle of Lübeck	Succeeded by Greater Poland uprising (1806)
