= Joseph-Pierre-Élisabeth de Peytes de Moncabrié =

Joseph-Pierre-Élisabeth Peytes de Montcabrié (also spelled Peites) (French pronunciation: [ʒozɛf pjɛʁ elizabɛt pɛt də mɔ̃kabʁije]; 1771–1806) was a French soldier during the French Revolutionary Wars and superior officer in the Grande Armée during the Napoleonic Wars.

Born in 1771 in Toulouse, Pierre-Élisabeth Peytes de Montcabrié was the second son of the then ensign, later rear-admiral of the French Navy. While still very young, Pierre-Elisabeth was admitted at the École Militaire in Paris, subsequently serving in the French Revolutionary army during some of the campaigns of the Revolutionary Wars and gaining a promotion to superior officer. He then served in Napoleon's Grande Armée and was mortally wounded on 6 November 1806, at the battle of Lübeck, while serving as chief of staff of artillery in Marshal Jean-de-Dieu Soult's IV Corps. Pierre-Elisabeth Peytes de Montcabrié died on 8 November, as a result of the battle wound he had received two days before.

== Sources ==
- (in French) Oettinger, Eduard Maria - "Biographie universelle, ou dictionnaire historique, contenant la nécrologie des hommes de tous les pays, des articles consacrés à l'histoire générale des peuples, aux batailles mémorables, aux grands événements politiques, etc."
- (in French) Pigeard, Alain - „Dictionnaire des batailles de Napoléon”, Tallandier, Bibliothèque Napoléonienne, 2004, ISBN 2-84734-073-4
