= Treis Castle =

Castle ruin in Germany

- Treisburg
- Treis-Karden
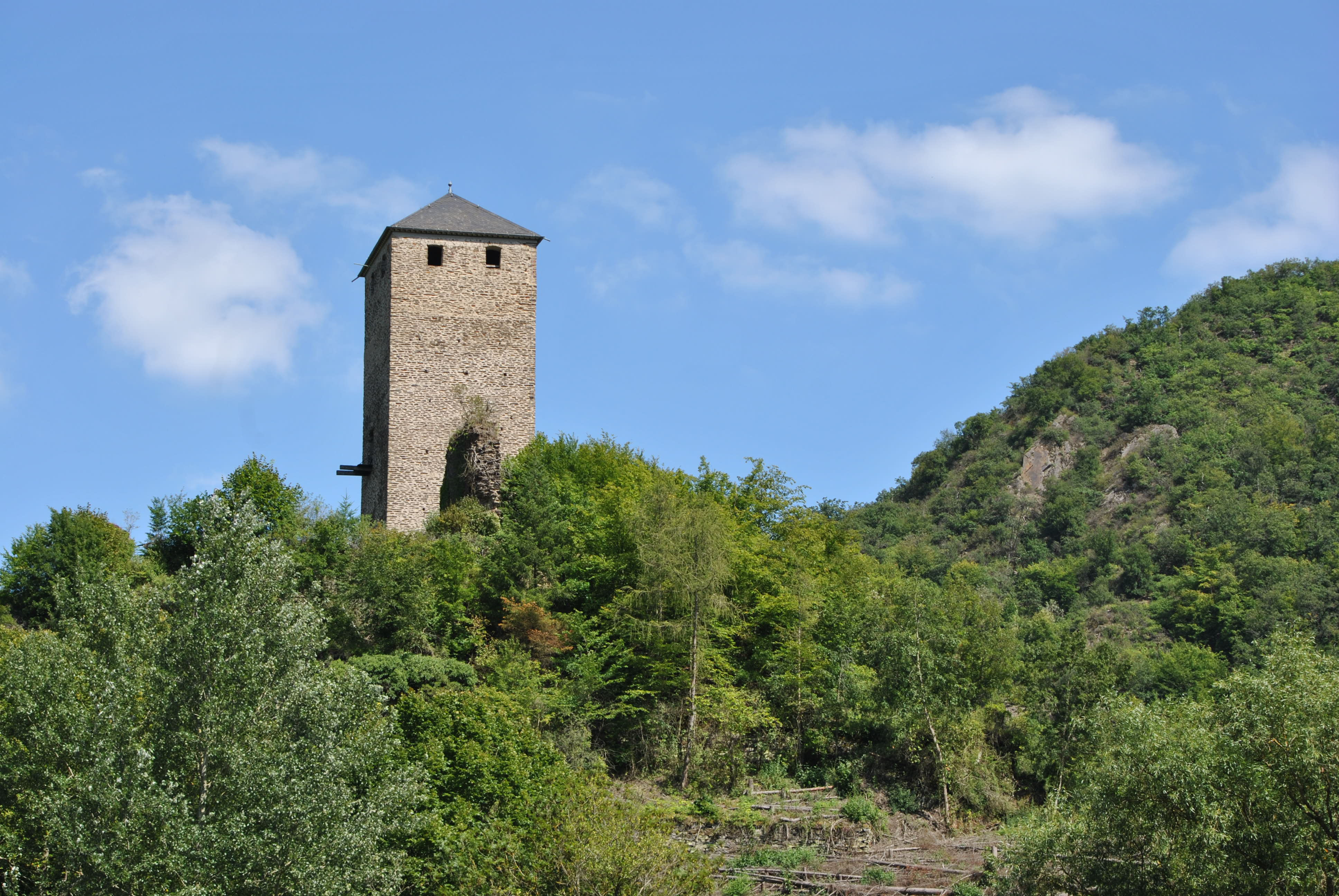
- Rebuilt and covered castle keep of Treis Castle in August 2012

Site information
- Type: hill castle
- Code: DE-RP
- Condition: partially restored

Location
- Coordinates: 50°9′56.30″N 7°17′54.50″E
- Height: 157 m above sea level (NHN)

Site history
- Built: around 1100 AD

Garrison information
- Occupants: nobility, clerics

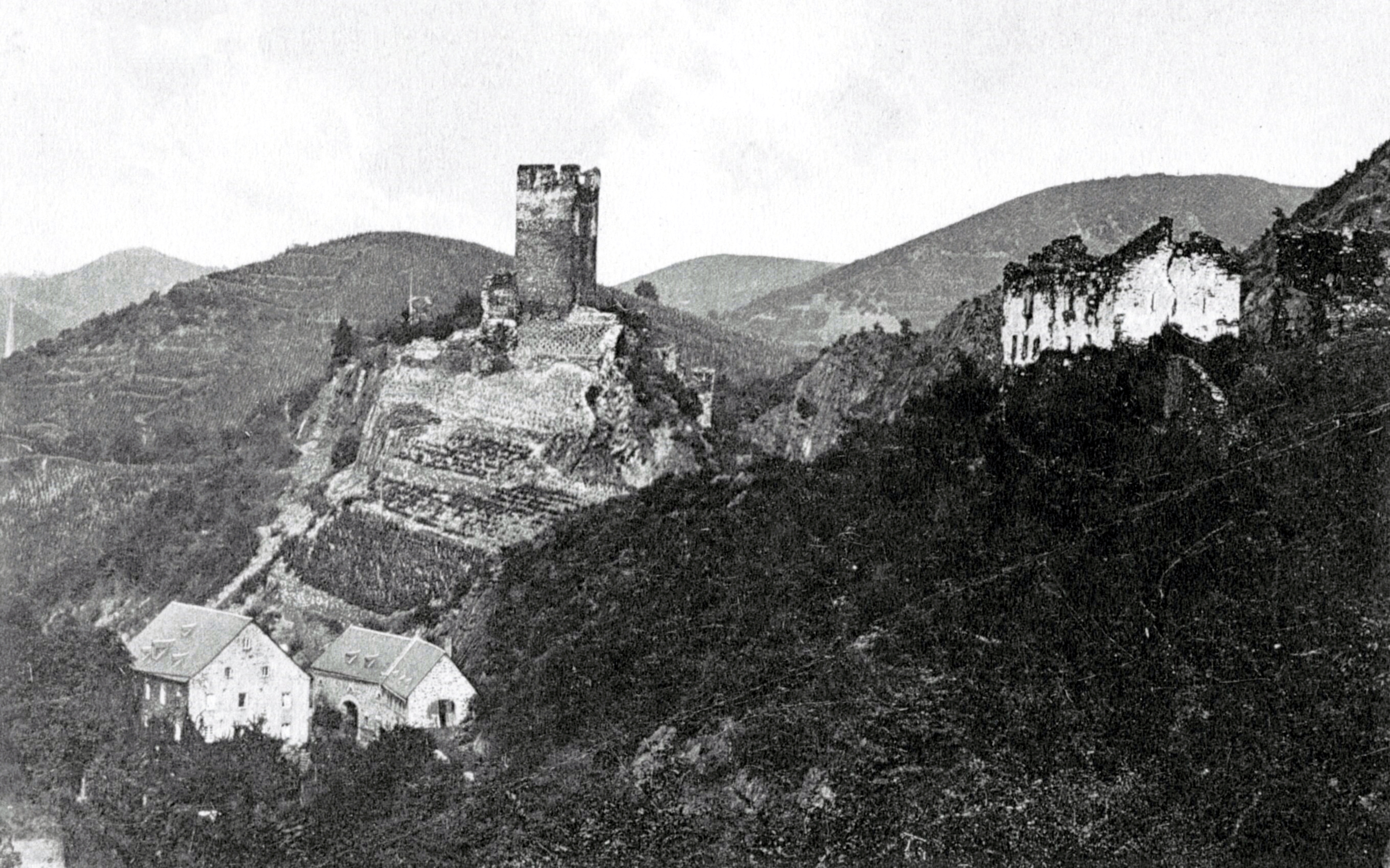
Treis Castle (left) and Wildburg Castle ruin (right) around 1910

Treis Castle, also called Treisburg, is a castle ruin in the municipality of Treis-Karden on the Moselle in the district of Cochem-Zell in the state of Rhineland-Palatine in Germany. It is located 30 kilometres south-west of the city of Koblenz.

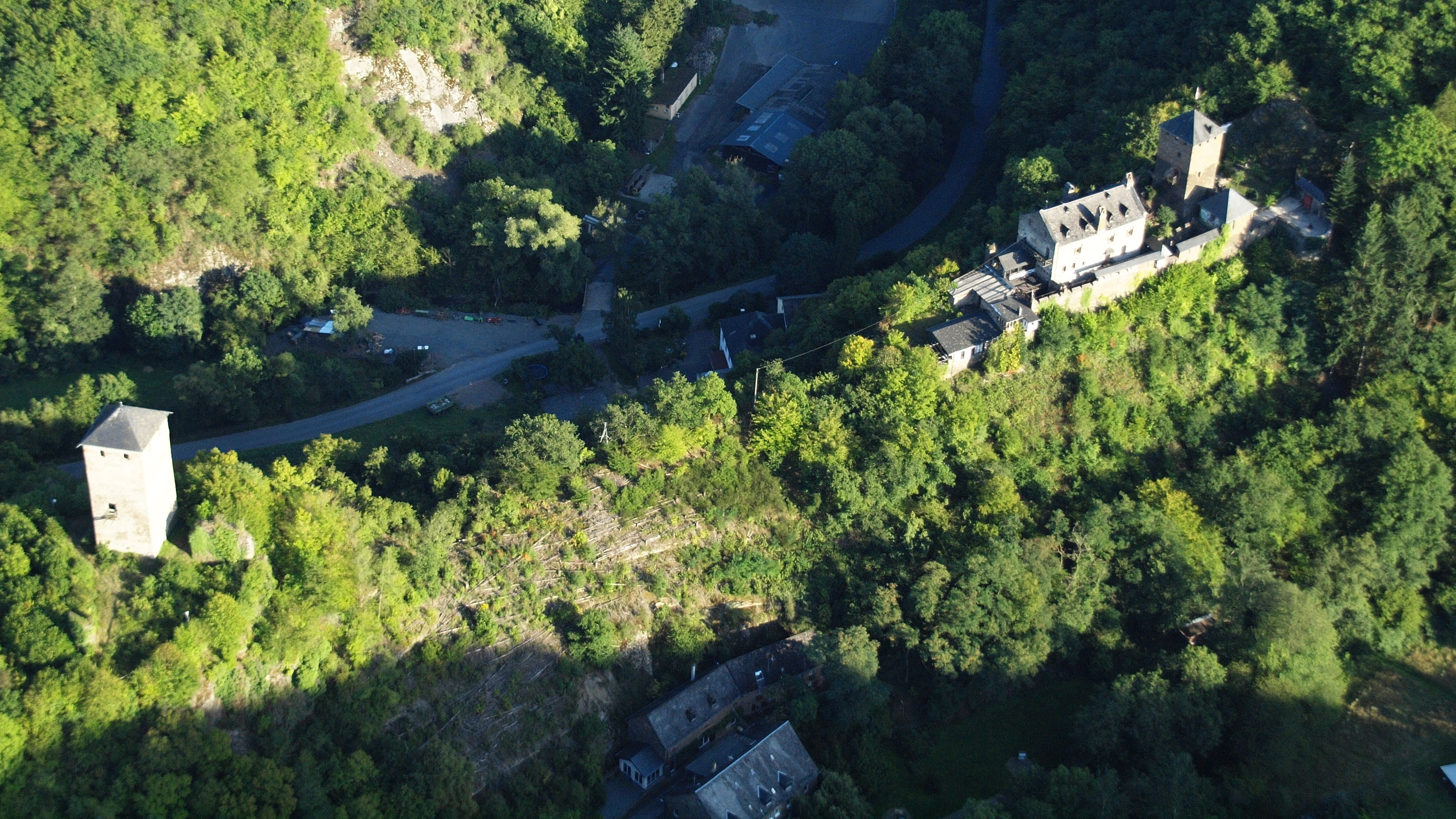
Treis Castle (left) and restored Wildburg Castle (right), Aerial View, 2015

== Location ==
The ruins of this hill castle stand on a mountain spur surrounded by the streams Flaumbach and Dünnbach flowing from the Hunsrück mountain range, approximately 70 metres above their confluence. Wildburg Castle, is located about 150 metres to the south on the same spur, separated by a depression. Castle Treis is located at an altitude of 157 meters above sea level, and about one kilometre south of Treis, a little aloof of the Moselle Valley.

== History ==
The exact date of the castle's construction is unknown; Treis Castle may have been built as early as in the second half of the 11th century. The first reliable record of Treis Castle dates back to 1121. That year, Emperor Henry V destroyed a castle at Treis, built by Otto I, Count of Salm. In 1148, Treis castle was held by the Count Palatine of the Rhine, Hermann III of Stahleck. In the course of a dispute over the office of Count Palatine between Hermann III and Otto I, Treis Castle came under influence of the diocese of Trier. Ultimately, the Archbishop of Trier, Albero de Montreuil conquered Castle Treis, making it property of the diocese. It appears that during the 12th and 13th century, the castle would have been controlled by the Archdeacon of Karden. In the late 13th century, there is clear evidence for the castle being owned by the Electorate of Trier and thereby being under direct control of the Archbishop. Successively, members of various noble houses became notable as bailiffs or Burgmannen of Trier in Treis: Freie von Treis, the Lords of Pyrmont, the Lords of Winneburg-Beilstein, and the Lords of Eltz.

During the Palatine succession war in 1689, Treis Castle has been destroyed by French troops, and not been rebuilt.

Since the 1950s, private owners have secured the ruins and rebuilt the castle keep.

== Today ==
Present-day's appearance of the ruins are dominated by a mighty, square keep, which was elevated by one floor and roofed during restoration works, re-instating its original appearance. In addition, remains of other buildings and the curtain wall are preserved. Access to Treis Castle is restricted (as of: August 20th, 2015).
