= Lübeck Museum of Theatre Puppets =

Museum in Germany

Coordinates: 53°51′56″N 10°40′56″E

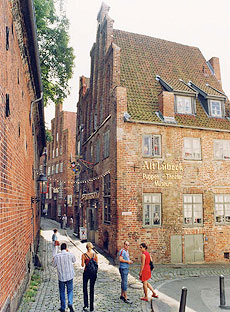
Lübeck Museum of Theatre Puppets

Lübeck Museum of Theatre Puppets, Schleswig-Holstein

The Lübeck Museum of Theatre Puppets (in German: TheaterFigurenMuseum Lübeck) is a museum of international puppetry in the Hanseatic city of Lübeck, Germany.

== Collection ==
Fritz Fey Jr's private TheaterFigurenMuseum Lübeck is located on a narrow street called Kolk situated close to the Holstentor and below the brick Gothic St. Peter's church in the medieval city centre of Lübeck.

For decades, Fey has collected anything related to the history of puppeteering in Germany and abroad and has exhibited parts of his collection in the Lübeck Museum of Theatre Puppets, which comprises five medieval brick houses. Other similar collections on puppeteering can be found in the Münchener Stadtmuseum in Munich or the Dresdner Puppenmuseum in Dresden. The museum and its collection is sponsored by the City of Lübeck, the investment bank of Schleswig-Holstein, the German Foundation for Monument Protection, and the private charitable foundation, Possehl-Stiftung.

The museum contains some thousand exhibits from three centuries and three continents (Europe, Africa and Asia). They demonstrate that puppeteers have always and everywhere tried to hold a mirror up to their societies. The puppets they have used are technically quite different: glove puppets, marionettes, rod- and finger puppets, shadow puppets, ventriloquist's dummies, mechanical puppets, five-in-one puppets: all these puppets are represented in this museum.

The stars of the museum include the imaginative shadow puppets from Indonesia (Wayang), "Moto Rafael, the Electric Drawer", the "Dog Clown" that was used in scenes with real dogs, or the technically sophisticated "metamorphoses".

In addition to the puppets, the museum displays posters, props, scenery, costumes, musical instruments and entire puppet theaters.

The museum offers a quiz and has a video room with a short documentary showing puppet plays from all over the world.

The museum has a shop and a café with old marionettes and illustrations of gruesome and moralising ballads formerly recited by street singers.

== Publications ==
- TheaterFigurenMuseum Lübeck / Figurentheater Lübeck / UNIMA Deutschland, Fundsache: KRAMER - entdeckt, erkundet, entwickelt, Theaterfiguren im Kolk - Band 1: Sonderausstellung - Filmnacht - Symposium, Puppen & Masken, Frankfurt 2012, ISBN 978-3-935011-85-3
- TheaterFigurenMuseum Lübeck / UNIMA Deutschland, Im Reich der Schatten - Chinesisches Schattentheater trifft Peking-Oper, Theaterfiguren im Kolk - Band 2: Katalog zur Sonderausstellung, Puppen & Masken, Frankfurt 2012, ISBN 978-3-935011-86-0
