= Burgtor =

City gate in Lübeck, Germany

Coordinates: 53.8738°N 10.6912°E

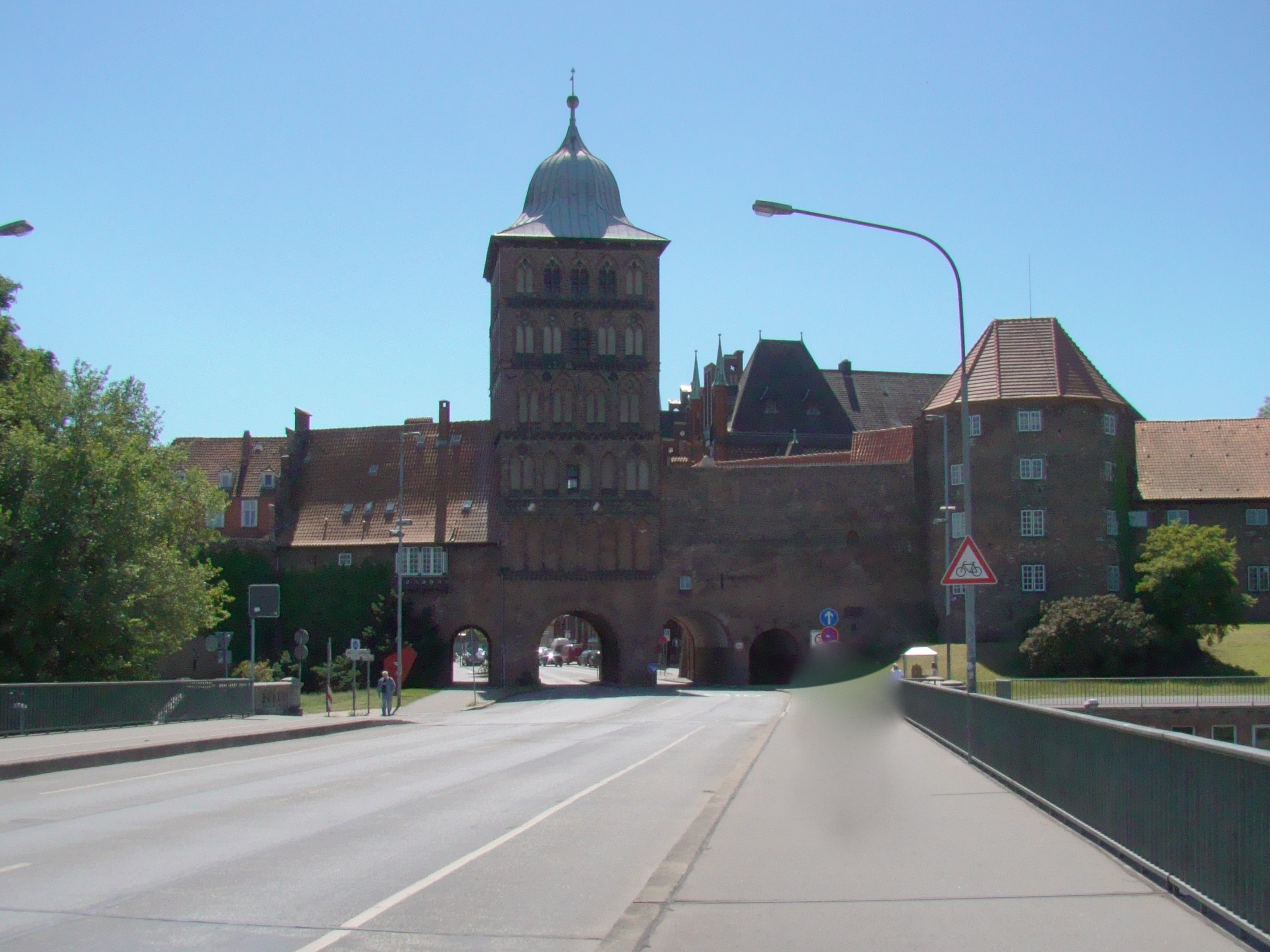
Burgtor Gate in June 2009

The Burgtor, built 1444 in late Gothic style, was the northern city gate of Hanseatic Lübeck, now in Germany. It is one of two towered gates remaining from the medieval fortifications, the other being the more famous Holstentor.

The Baroque helmet-like roof was added in 1685.
