= Holsten Gate =

City gate in Lübeck, Germany

Coordinates: 53°51′58″N 10°40′47″E

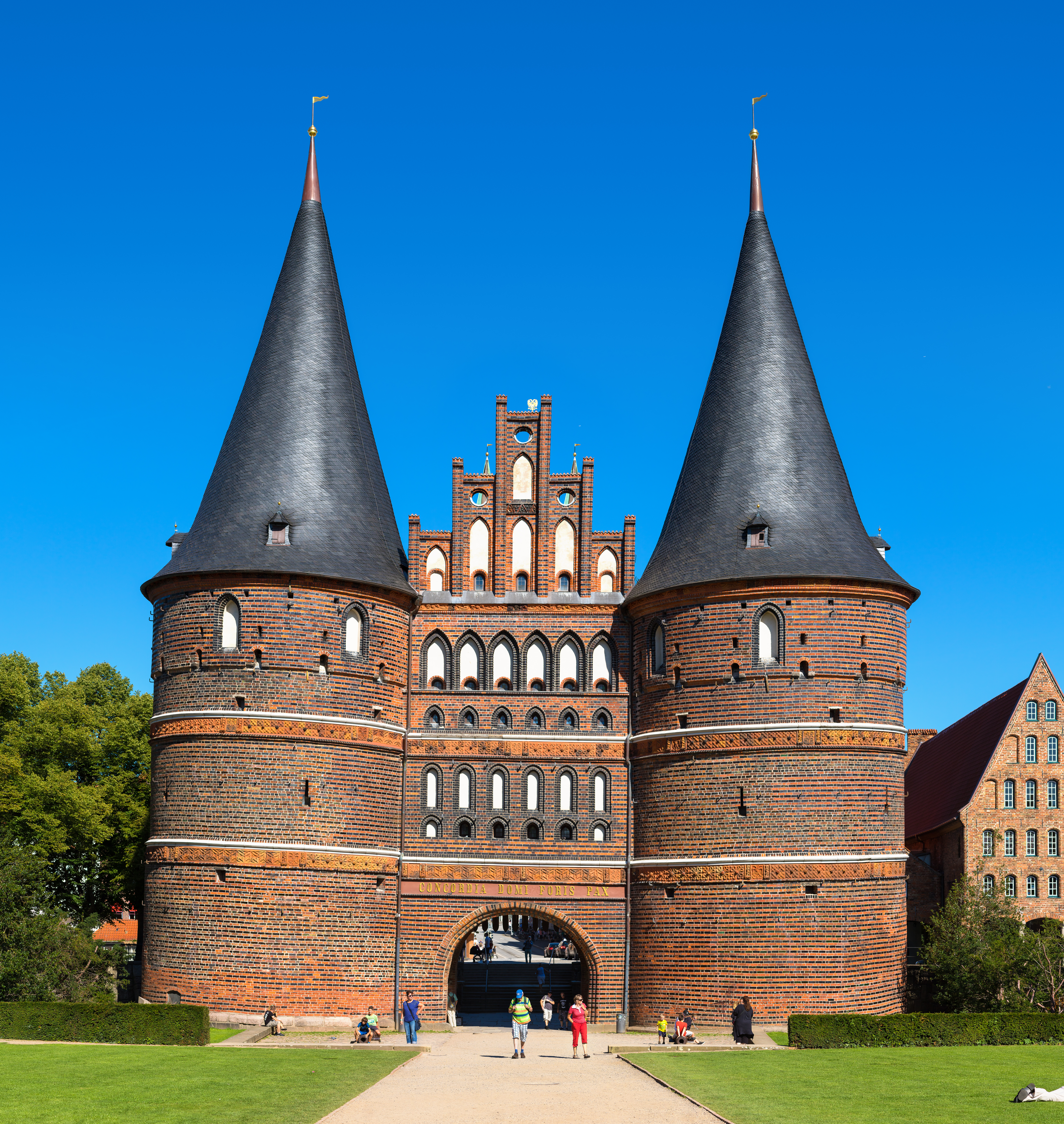
Holsten Gate ("field side")

The Holsten Gate (Low German and German: Holstentor) is a city gate marking off the western boundary of the old center of the Hanseatic city of Lübeck. Built in 1464, the Brick Gothic construction is one of the relics of Lübeck's medieval city fortifications and one of two remaining city gates, the other being the Citadel Gate (Burgtor). Known for its two-round towers and arched entrance, it is regarded today as a symbol of the city. Together with the old city centre (Altstadt) of Lübeck it has been a UNESCO World Heritage Site since 1987.

== Appearance ==
The "city side" of the Holsten Gate in 2015

The Holsten Gate is composed of a south tower, a north tower and a central building. It has four floors, except for the ground floor of the central block, where the gate's passageway is located. The side facing west (away from the city) is called the "field side", the side facing the city the "city side". The two towers and the central block appear as one construction when viewed from the city side. On the field side, the three units can be clearly differentiated. Here the two towers form semicircles which at their widest point extend 3.5 metres beyond the central block. The towers have conical roofs; the central block has a pediment.

=== Passageway and inscriptions ===
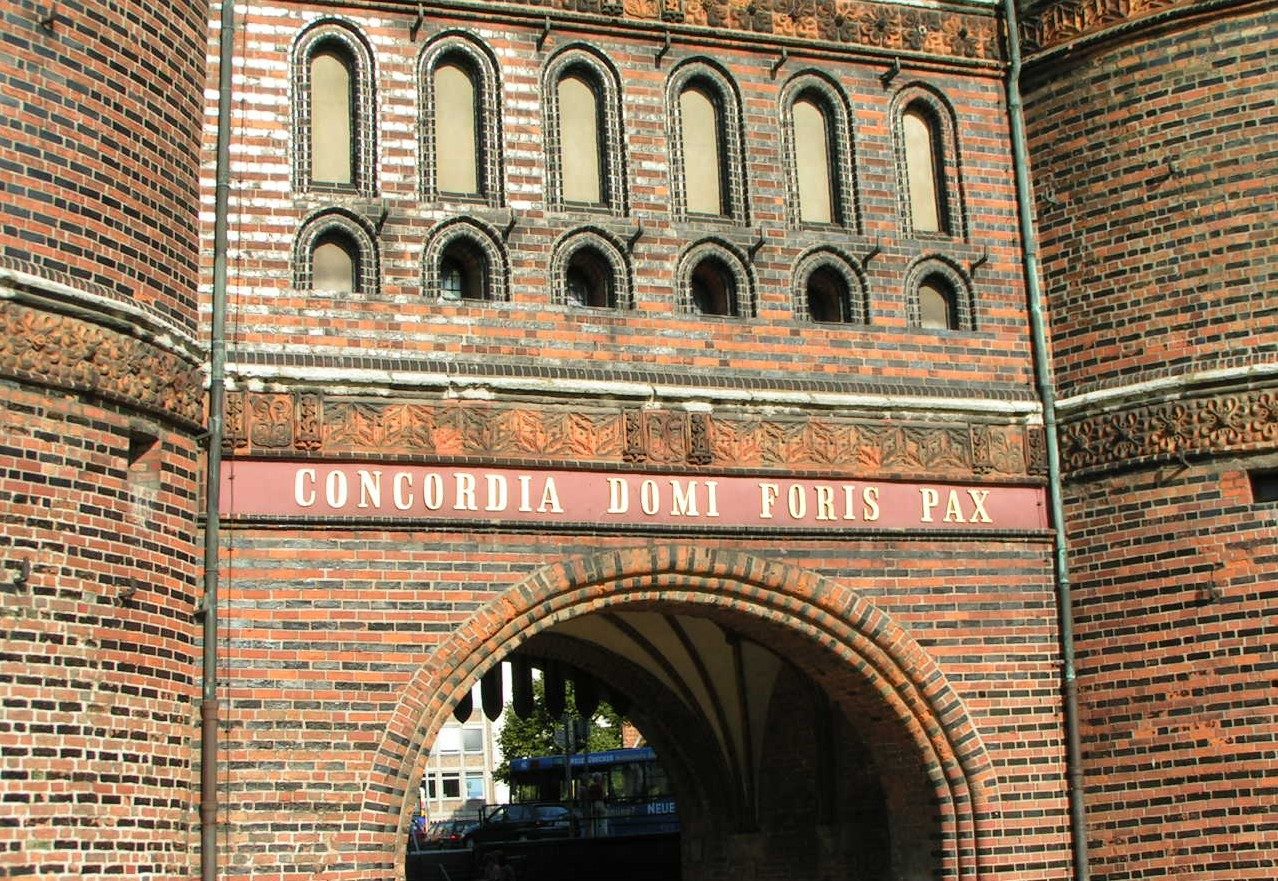
Inscription on the field side of the Holsten Gate: CONCORDIA DOMI FORIS PAX

The passageway once had two gates on the field side, which have not survived. A portcullis installed in 1934 does not correspond to the original security installations. Instead, there was once a so-called "pipe organ" at this location, with individual bars which could be lowered separately rather than together as a set. Thus it was possible to first lower all but one or two rods, leaving a small gap for their own men to slip through later. There is an inscription over the passageway on both the city side and the field side.

On the city side it reads, "SPQL" and is framed by the years 1477 and 1871, the former being the supposed date of construction (the correct date is, however, now known to be 1478), the latter being the date of the gate's restoration and the founding of the German Reich. This inscription was modeled on the Roman "SPQR" (Latin Senatus populusque Romanus - the Senate and People of Rome) and stands for Senatus populusque Lubecensis. It was, however, affixed only in 1871. There was previously no inscription at this location. It would also have been pointless, since the view of the lower parts of the Holsten Gate from the city side was obscured by high walls.

There is another inscription on the field side. The text is "concordia domi foris pax" ("harmony within, peace outside"). This inscription is also from 1871 and is a shortened form of the text which had previously been on the (not preserved) foregate: "Concordia domi et pax foris sane res est omnium pulcherrima" ("Harmony within and peace outside are indeed the greatest good of all"; see "Outer Holsten Gate" below).

=== Fortifications on the field side ===
Functionally, the field and the city side have very different designs. While the city side is richly decorated with windows, this would be inappropriate on the field side considering the possibility of combat situations. On the field side there are accordingly only a few small windows. In addition, the walls are interspersed with embrasures. Also, the wall thickness on the field side is greater than on the city side: 3.5 metres compared to less than 1 metre. The reasoning during construction may have been to be able to quickly destroy the gate from the city side in an emergency, so that it would not fall into enemy hands as a bulwark.

The loopholes and the openings of the gun chambers are directed toward the field side. In each tower there were three gun chambers, one each on the ground, first and second floors. Those on the ground floor have not been preserved. Since the building has subsided over the centuries, they are now 50 centimetres below ground level, and even below the new flooring. On the first upper storey there are, in addition to the aforementioned chambers, two slits for small guns which were above and between the three chambers. There are also small openings on the third upper storey with forward- and downward-directed slits for firing small arms.

The central block has no loopholes. The windows above the passage were also designed for dousing invaders with pitch or boiling water.

=== Ornamentation ===
The most striking nonfunctional embellishments are two so-called terracotta stripes which encircle the building. These consist of individual tiles, most of which are square with sides of 55 centimetres. Each tile bears one of three different ornaments: either an arrangement of four heraldic lilies, a symmetrical lattice, or a representation of four thistle leaves. There is no apparent order to these recurring symbols, but each group of eight tiles is always followed by a tile with a different design. It has the form of a heraldic shield and bears either the Lübeck heraldic eagle or a stylized tree. These shields are flanked by two male figures who function as bearers of a coat of arms.

The terracotta stripes were repaired during restoration work between 1865 and 1870. Only three of the original tiles are preserved as museum specimens. The new tiles approximate the former design, although liberties were taken during the restoration. For example, the design of the heraldic eagle motif is by no means a reflection of the original.

The pediment was also not faithfully restored, but this is not the fault of the restorers, since in the 19th century it had long been gone and its original appearance was unknown. An old view on an altarpiece in the Lübeck fortress monastery shows a Holsten Gate with five pediment towers. But since this picture shows the Holstentor Gate in the middle of a fantasy landscape of mountains and forests the credibility of the representation is disputed. Today, three towers crown the pediment, but they are visible only from the city side.

It was constructed with red bricks.

=== Interior ===
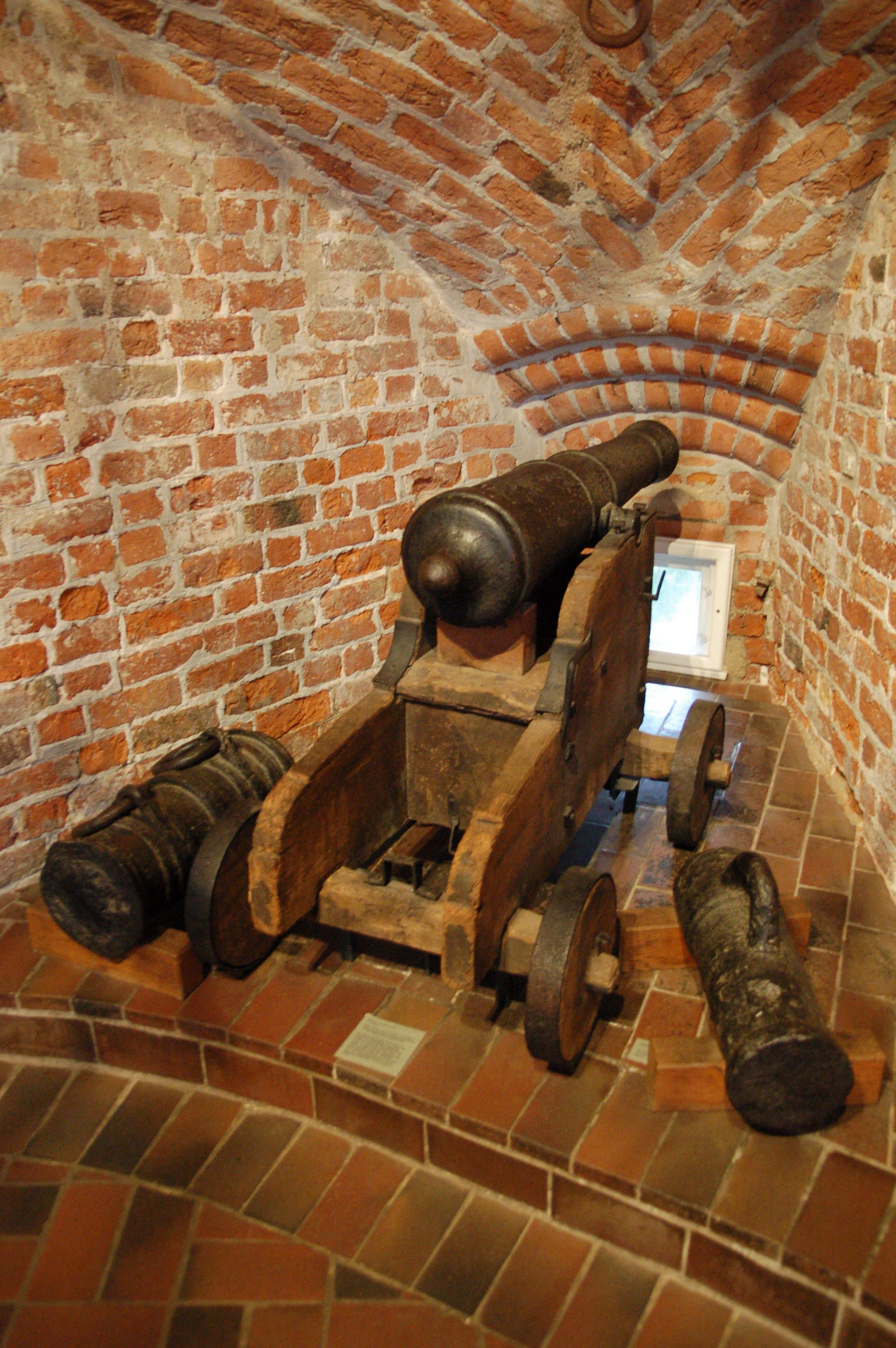
Modern reproduction of a cannon in the Holsten Gate

Both tower interiors have the same design. The ground floor and first upper story have the highest ceilings, while the floors above are much lower. Two narrow spiral staircases wind their way upwards, in each case between the central building and the adjacent tower. On each floor corridors connect the rooms of the central block with tower rooms at the same level. The ceiling of the north tower's second floor has been removed, so that today the second and third upper storeys there share a common space. This change dates from 1934 and does not reflect the original situation.

The gun chambers are in front of the loopholes. Today there are guns in the chambers of the second floor, but they are not originals and were placed there at a late date. Above the gun chambers are hooks from which chains were suspended and attached to the cannon to cushion the recoil after firing. The higher gun chambers of the first upper storey could only be accessed with ladders.

== History ==
The rich Hanseatic city of Lübeck felt the need in the course of the centuries to protect itself from outside threats with ever stronger walls and fortifications. Three gates gave access to the city: the Citadel Gate in the north, Mill Gate in the south, and the Holsten Gate in the west. To the east, the city was protected by the dammed Wakenitz River. Here, the less martial Hüxter Gate led out of the city.

These city gates were initially simple gates which were repeatedly strengthened over time so that they eventually all had an outer, middle and inner gate. Today, only fragments remain of these ancient city gates. The gate now known as the Citadel Gate is the former Interior Citadel Gate; the Middle and Outer Citadel Gates no longer exist. All three Mill Gates have completely disappeared. The gate now known as the Holsten Gate is the former Middle Holsten Gate; there was also an (older) Inner Holsten Gate, an Outer Holsten Gate, and even a fourth gate, known as the Second Outer Holsten Gate. So the history of the Holsten Gate is actually the history of four consecutive gates, although only one of them is left.

The names of the individual gates changed as a matter of course as their components emerged and disappeared. The Middle Holsten Gate was once the Outer Holsten Gate before the gates on either side were constructed. Still today there is a great deal of confusion about the names as one studies the historical record. The four gates and their history are described below.

=== Inner Holsten Gate ===
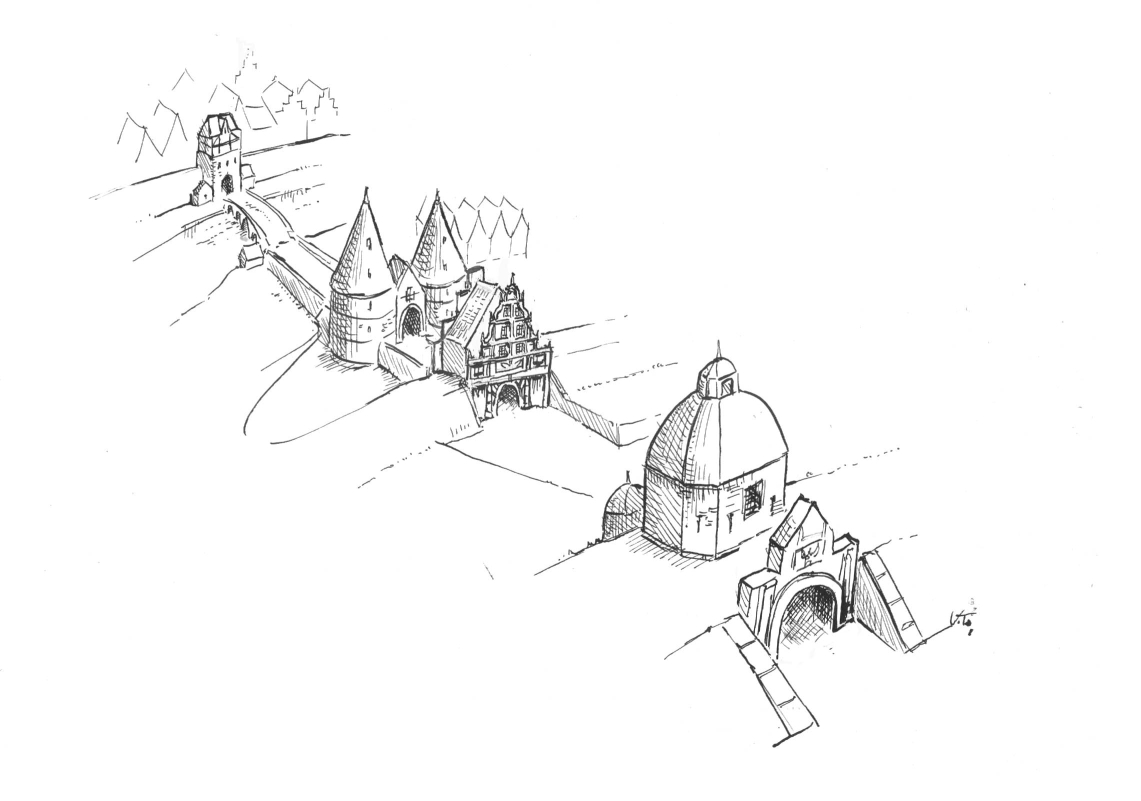
The Holsten Gate in 1700. The drawing shows the various gates as they appeared around 1700. In the front the Second Outer Holsten Gate is visible, followed by the Outer and Middle Holsten Gates Behind the Holsten Bridge is the Inner Holsten Gate—in this picture the half-timbered construction which replaced the original gate in the 17th century.

The oldest Holsten Gate guarded the nearby banks of the Trave River. One had to leave the city through this gate in order to get to the Holsten Bridge, which crossed the river. It is not known when a gate was erected here for the first time. The Holsten Bridge was first mentioned in a 1216 deed signed by the king of Denmark. It is likely that already at that time there was a gate and a city wall along the Trave River. The designations "Holsten Bridge" (and "Holsten Gate") are simply a consequence of the fact that the city's western exit was in the direction of Holstein.

Historical records indicate that the Holsten Bridge and Holsten Gate were renewed in 1376. There is good evidence for the appearance of the gate erected at that time in a woodcut of a view of the city of Lübeck produced by Elias Diebel. Although this is a city view from the eastern, Wakenitz side of the old inner city hill, the artist has folded out essential parts of the gate's west side, so that they too become visible. It was a rectangular tower with a wooden gallery on the upper part.

At an unknown date in the 17th century, the Inner Holsten Gate was replaced by a smaller, simple half-timbered gate—possibly because no point was seen in having a strong inner gate in light of the strong outer fortifications which had been erected in the meantime. The Inner Holsten Tor was connected to the dwelling of the tollkeeper, who guarded the access to the city at this location.

The half-timbered gate was replaced by a simple iron gate in 1794, which in turn was demolished in 1828, together with the tollkeeper's house and the city wall along the Trave River.

It is likely that there was a gate also on the opposite bank of the Trave at an early date. But nothing is known of its appearance. If it existed, it was torn down before or after the construction of the Middle Holsten Gate.

=== Middle Holsten Gate ===
In the 15th century the entire gate construction was considered to be inadequate. The proliferation of firearms and canon made stronger fortifications necessary. It was decided to build another gate—the Outer Holsten Gate, later known as the Middle Holsten Gate and today only as the Holsten Gate. Funding was secured by a legacy of the councilman John Broling amounting to 4,000 Lübeck marks. In 1464 the city's architect, Hinrich Helmstede, began construction, which was completed in 1478. It was erected on a seven-metre high hill raised for the purpose. Already during the construction period this foundation proved to be unstable. The south tower sagged because of the marshy ground and already during constructions attempts were made to compensate for its inclination.

For more history of the Middle Holsten Gate see the section on demolition and restoration below.

=== Outer Holsten Gate ===
The exterior Holsten Gate was also known as the Renaissance Gate, the Foregate or the Crooked Gate. It was constructed in the 16th century when a wall was built west of the Middle Holsten Gate into which a gate was inserted. The outer Holsten Gate was completed in 1585. The new gate obstructed the view of the Middle Holsten Gate since its eastern exit was located only 20 metres from that construction. A walled area known as the zwinger was created between the two gates.

Its foregate was small compared with the approximately one hundred years older Middle Holsten Gate, but much more richly decorated on the field side. The city side was by contrast left plain. The Outer Holsten Gate was the first gate to bear an inscription. It read, "Pulchra res est pax foris et concordia domi – MDLXXXV" ("It is wonderful to have peace without and harmony within - 1585") and was placed on the city side. It was later moved to the field side and slightly modified ("Concordia domi et foris pax sane res est omnium pulcherrima", "harmony within and peace without are the greatest good of all"). Connected to the gate was the home of the Wall Master, who was responsible for the maintenance of the fortifications.

The builder of the Renaissance gate was probably the city architect Hermann von Rode, who designed the front following Dutch prototypes. For example, the Nieuwe Oosterpoort in Hoorn is directly comparable. This gate existed for about 250 years and was in the end sacrificed to the railway; it was demolished in 1853 to make room for the first Lübeck train station and tracks. Today, this station no longer exists either; the present station is located about 500 metres to the west.

=== Second Outer Holsten Gate ===
At the beginning of the 17th century new city walls were built in front of the city moat, under the supervision of military engineer Johhann von Brüssel. As part of this construction a fourth Holsten Gate was built in 1621. It was completely integranted into the high walls and topped by an octagonal tower. The archways bore the inscriptions "Si Deus pro nobis, quis contra nos" ( "If God be for us, who can be against us?") on the city side and "sub alis altissimi" ("Under the protection of the Most High") on the field side. This gate was the last of the four Holsten Gates to be constructed and the first to disappear, namely in 1808.

=== Demolition and restoration in the 19th century ===
In the course of industrialization, the fortifications were considered to be only annoying obstacles. In 1808 the second outer Holsten Gate was demolished, in 1828 the inner Holsten Gate, and in 1853 the outer Holsten Gate. It was then considered to be only as a matter of time before the Middle Holsten Gate, the only remaining of the four gates, would be torn down. Indeed, in 1855, Lübeck citizens petitioned the Senate to finally demolish the remaining gate, since it hindered the extension of the railway facilities. This petition had 683 signatures.

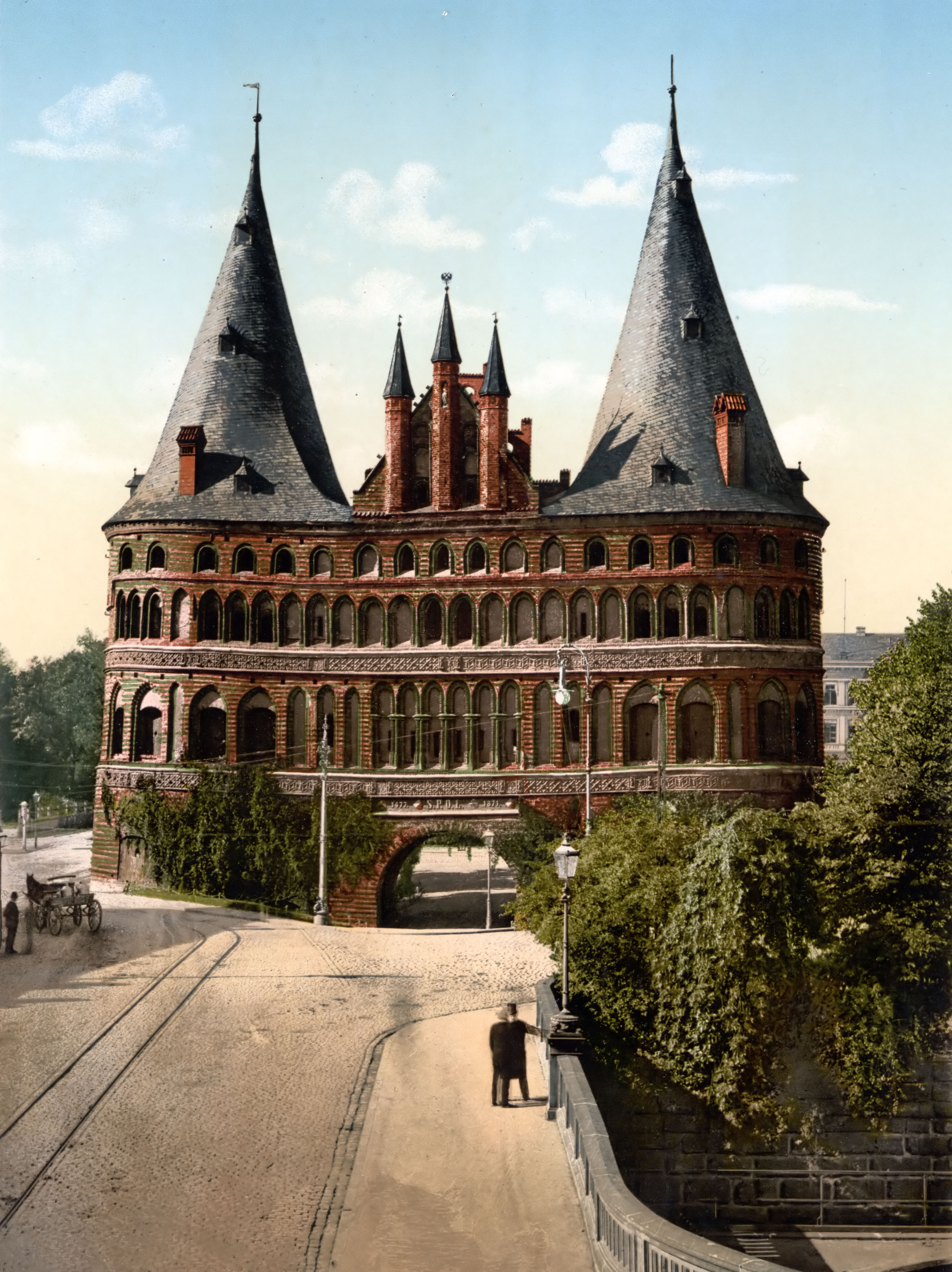
The Holsten Gate around 1900. Looking west at the gate's eastern side, which faces Lübeck's old city centre ("city side")

However, there was at that time also growing resistance to the destruction of old buildings. Thus August Reichensperger wrote in 1852, "Even Lübeck, once the proud head of the Hanseatic League, does not seem able to endure the reflection of its former glory. It maims, crops and covers up so assiduously that "modern Enlightenment" will soon have nothing to be ashamed of any more". When King Frederick William IV of Prussia heard of this, he sent Prussia's then-curator of historic monuments, Ferdinand von Quast, to salvage whatever could be saved.

Controversy over the demolition went on for a long time. A decision was made only in 1863 when the Lübeck citizens decided by a majority of just one vote not to demolish the building but to instead extensively restore it. Meanwhile, the gate was in very bad condition, since every year it had sunk a few centimetres further into the ground. The lowest loopholes were already 50 centimetres below ground, and the inclination of the entire gate was beginning to be dangerous. This drastically altered the statics of the building, so that its collapse was feared. The Holsten Gate was thoroughly restored, with work continuing into 1871.

Afterwards there was a change in the relationship of the Lübeck population to the Holsten Gate. It was no longer perceived as a troublesome ruin, but as a symbol of a proud past. In 1925, the German Association of Cities made the Holstentor its symbol. As early as 1901, the marzipan manufacturer Niederegger used the Holsten gate in its company trademark. Other Lübeck companies did the same.

=== Restoration 1933/34 ===
Since the towers continued to slant and their collapse could still not be ruled out, a second restoration became necessary. This occurred in the years 1933-34, during which the Holsten Gate was stabilized so that it finally stood firm. In this final restoration, reinforced concrete anchors were used to secure the towers, which were girded by iron rings. Changes were, however, also made which did not correspond with the original character of the gate, including the above-mentioned merging of north tower floors. The Nazis turned the Holsten Gate into a museum. It was called the Hall of Honor and Glory, and was supposed to represent Lübeck and German history from the perspective of Nazi ideology.

In the second half of the 20th century minor repairs were made to the Holsten Gate which are no longer in line with current standards for architectural conservation.

=== Restoration 2005/06 ===
From March 2005 to December 2006, the Holsten Gate was again restored. The restoration was estimated to cost around one million euros, with 498,000 euros (the originally planned cost) being provided by the German Foundation for Monument Protection and the Possehl Foundation. The remaining costs were primarily covered through donations from individuals, companies and academic institutions. A swastika dating from 1934 was cut out and taken away by unknown parties a few days after the scaffolding was installed for the repairs. It was considered to be the last swastika still remaining on a public building in Germany and was supposed to be concealed with metal sheeting as part of the restoration work. A plate with the date 2006 was put up where the stolen swastika had been to commemorate the completion of restoration work.

On 2 December 2006, the Holstentor reopened to the public as part of a light show created by the artist Michael Batz. For safety reasons the gate had been obscured during restoration by a high resolution depiction of the gate before work had begun, printed on scaffolding tarpaulins.

== The Holsten Gate today ==
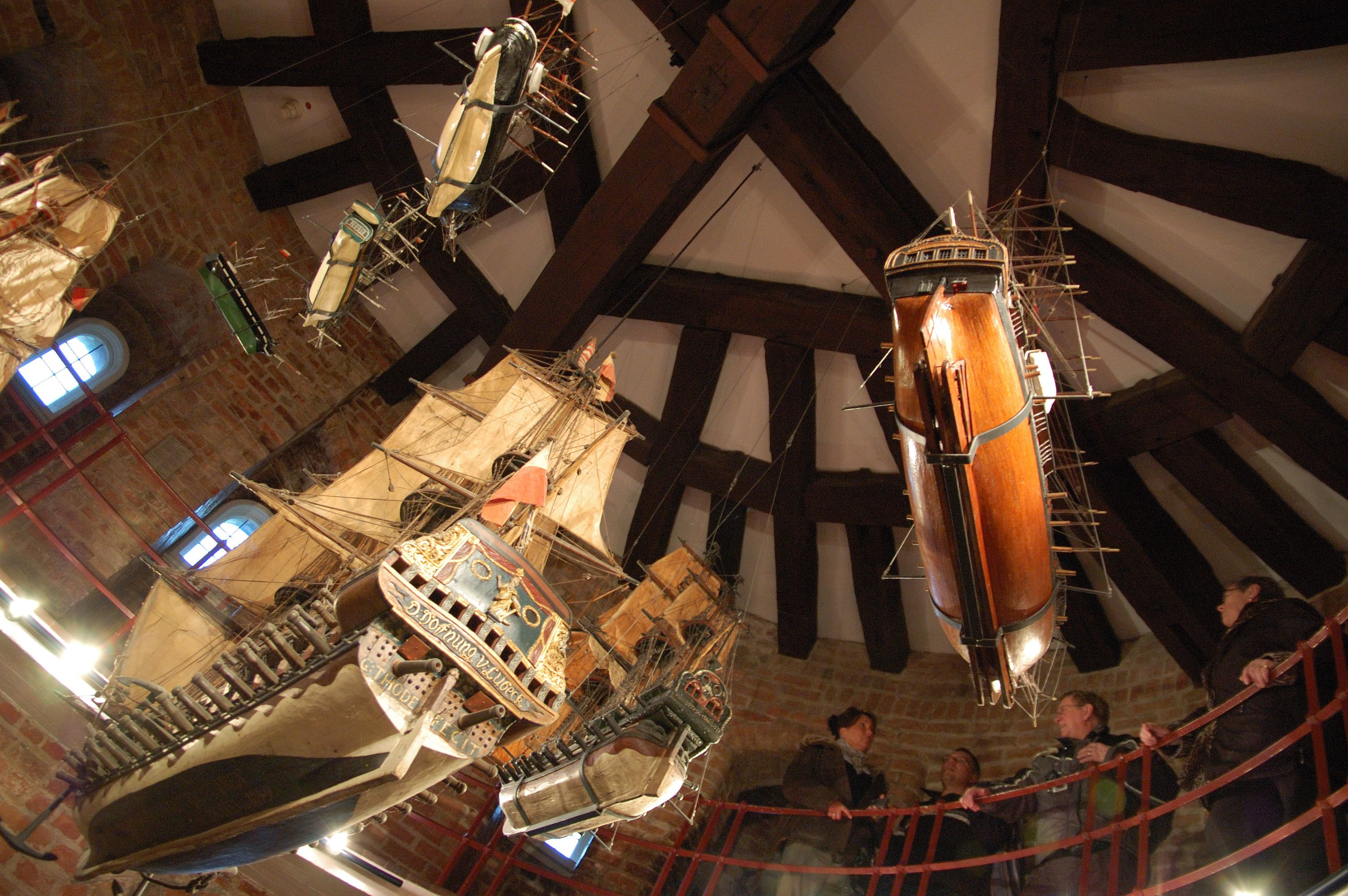
Ship models in the Holsten Gate

In 1950 the Holsten Gate was again a museum, this time for municipal history. Relics from historic Lübeck were presented, the development of medieval Lübeck was shown by using models and pictures, and models of the ships of the Hanseatic League and the flagship "Eagle of Lübeck" were exhibited. The features of this museum were also not historically accurate. For example, the museum also included a torture chamber with a dungeon, a rack and other torture devices. But the Holsten Gate had never contained anything like that.

The two monumental iron statues of reclining lions placed in an area in front of the Holsten Gate designed by Harry Maasz date from 1823 and are unsigned. They are attributed to Christian Daniel Rauch and may possibly have been made with the collaboration of a member of Rauch's workshop, Th. Kalide (1801–1863). One lion is asleep, the other is awake and attentively regards the other. They were originally placed in front of the house built in 1840 by the Lübeck merchant and art collector John Daniel Jacobj (1798–1847) at Große Petersgrube 18. In 1873 they were placed in front of the Hotel Stadt Hamburg am Klingenberg until its destruction in 1942 during World War II, and only later in front of the Holsten Gate. They are complemented by a bronze statue on the other side of the street, the Striding Antilope, by the sculptor Fritz Behn.

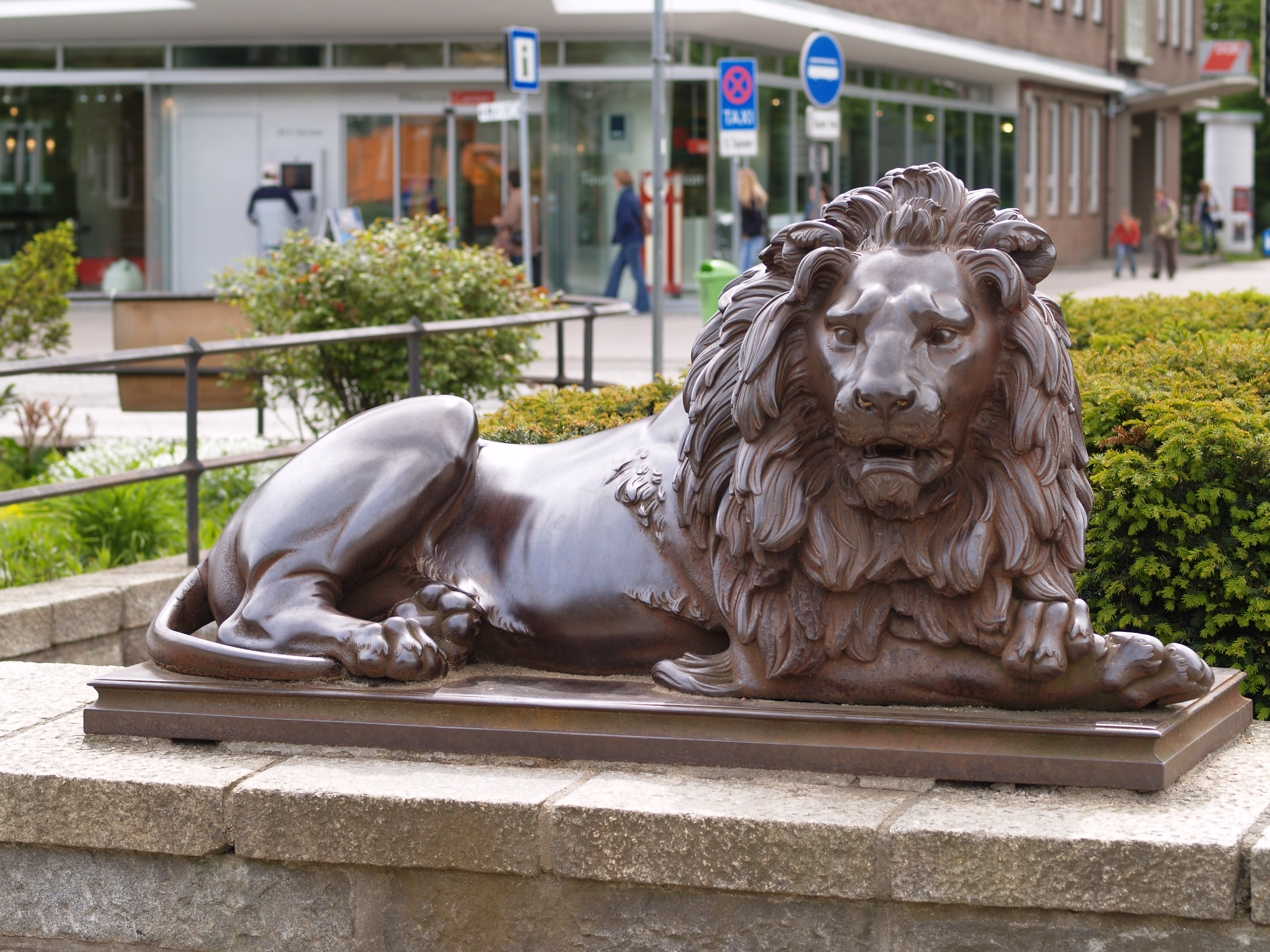
Lion on guard

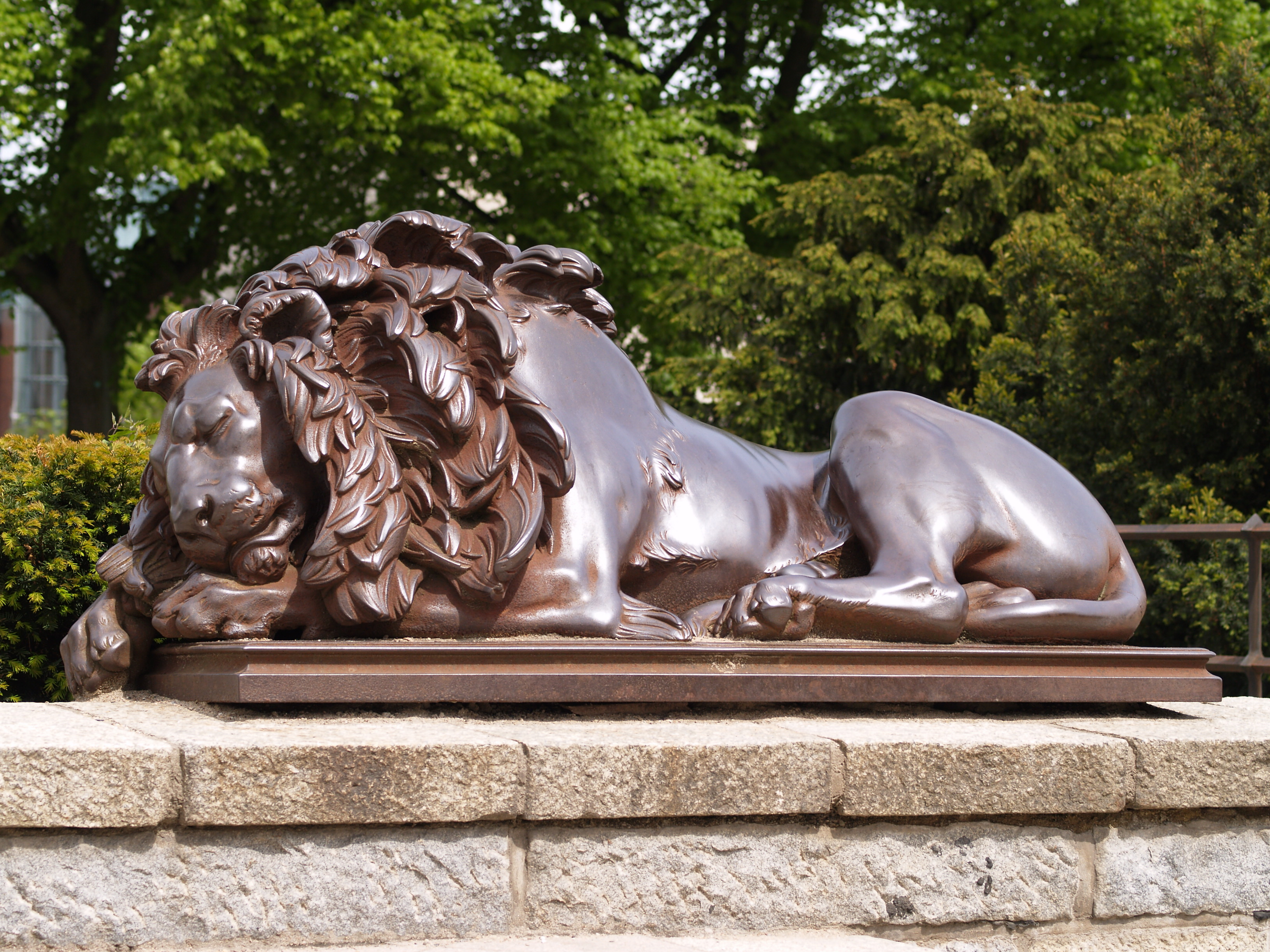
Sleeping lion

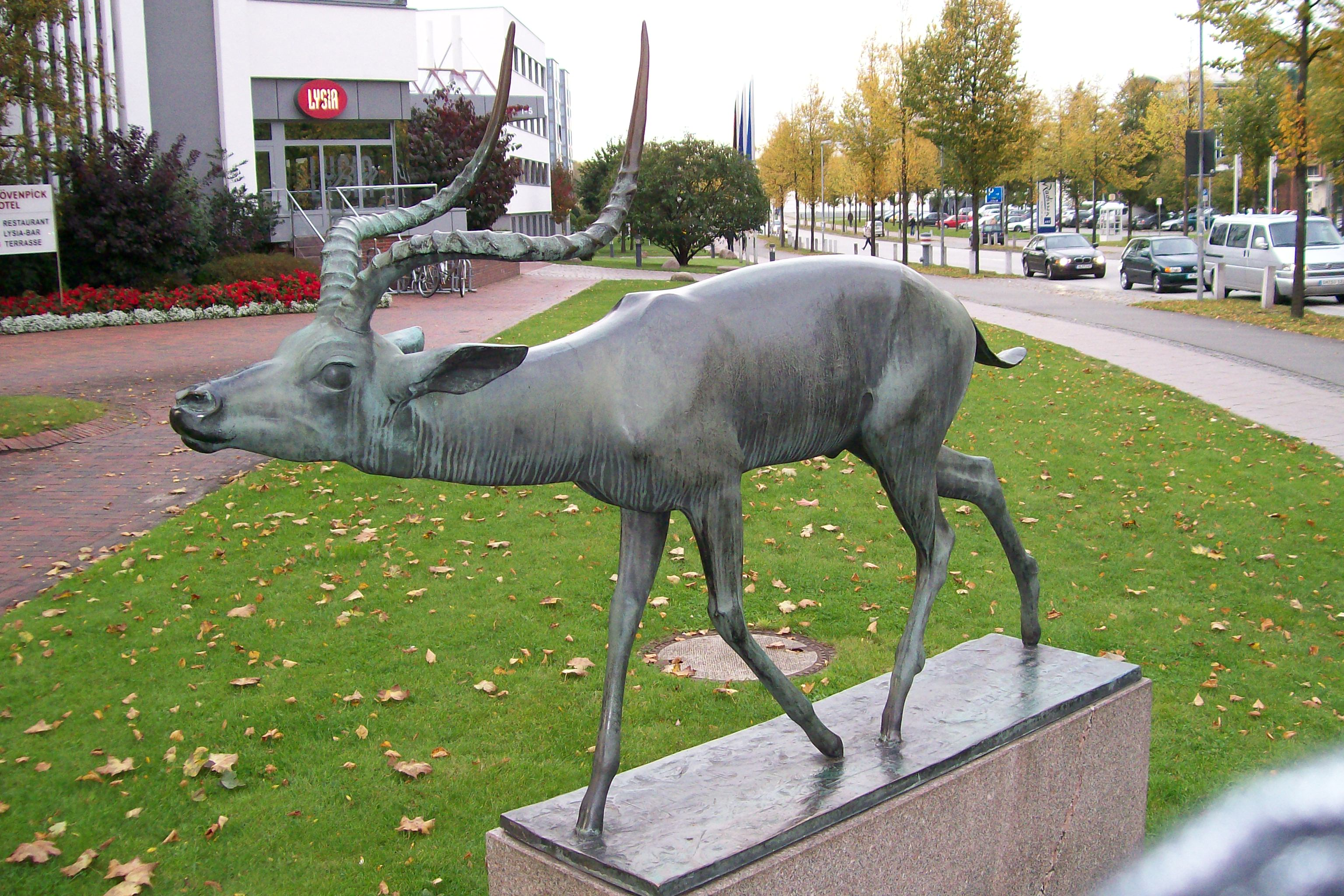
Striding antelope

The Holsten Gate Museum was modernized in 2002. Not only was the torture chamber removed; all rooms were redesigned according to a new concept that involved the integration of image and sound documentation. As of 2006, the museum has been managed by the Cultural Foundation of the Hanseatic City of Lübeck.

== Surroundings ==
The Holsten Gate is located in the Lübeck city wall complex on the main access road connecting the main railway station with the suburb of St. Lorenz and crossing the Puppen Bridge. The Holsten Gate Square (Holstentorplatz) is enclosed on one side by a branch of the Deutsche Bundesbank; with new construction extending the original Reichsbank building to the rear. On the other side there is the brick expressionist Holsten Gate Hall (Holstentorhalle) between the historic salt warehouses and the DGB's House of Trade Unions (Gewerkschaftshaus). This building was altered with funds from the Possehl Foundation to create a rehearsal and teaching facility for Lübeck's University of Music (Musikhochschule Lübeck) was rebuilt. Another pedestrian bridge over the Upper Trave River was completed in spring 2007 to provide a connection the university's main building complex in the old city centre.

== Miscellaneous ==
=== On currency and postage stamps ===
The Holsten Gate appears on the 50 DM bank notes produced from 1960 to 1991 and on the German two-euro coin issued in 2006.

In 1948 it appeared on the four highest denominations (DM 1, DM 2, DM 3 and DM 5) of the first long-term series of postage stamps in German mark currency, which featured buildings. In 1997 it appeared on the 510 Pf. postage stamp of another definitive series, "Places of Interest".

=== In video games ===
The gate appeared in the trading simulation The Patrician.

The gate also appeared as a landmark in the Maxis PC game Simcity 3000.

=== Other uses ===
Since 1926 there has been a stylization of the Holsten Gate in the emblem of the German Association of Cities (Deutscher Städtetag DST).

A simplified and scaled-down replica of the Holsten Gate was completed in 2008 for the Hansa Park in Sierksdorf.

The current Guinness World Record for the fastest marathon dressed as a landmark building was achieved by a Richard Mietz wearing a Holstentor costume at the 2018 Berlin Marathon

The Amphicar (a mass-produced amphibious automobile) built in Lübeck in the 1960s, sports a golden image of the Holstentor on the horn button in the center of the steering wheel. Many people who see the Amphicar think the emblem is a castle.
