= Battle of Jena–Auerstedt order of battle =

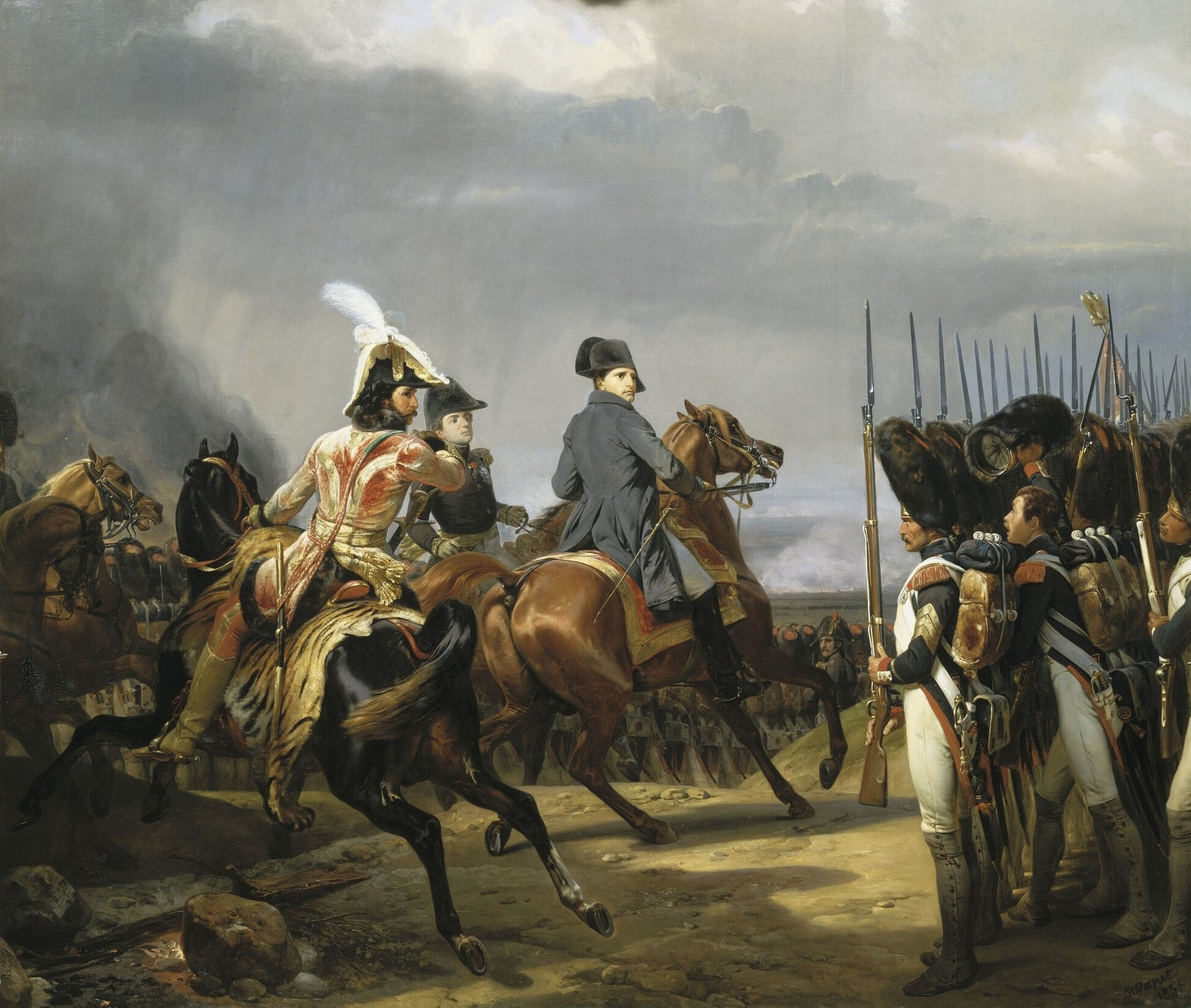
The Battle of Jena by Horace Vernet shows an incident from the battle. As the emperor ordered a general attack, a guardsman took off his bearskin hat and shouted "Forward". Napoleon rebuked the soldier, "Only a beardless youth would presume to judge in advance what I should do."

The order of battle at the Battle of Jena–Auerstedt is listed below. The order of battle includes units from the First French Empire and the Kingdom of Prussia that fought each other in the Battle of Jena-Auerstedt on 14 October 1806. The order of battle may be useful to trace the battles of Schleiz and Saalfeld, which occurred before Jena-Auerstedt, as well as battles and capitulations that happened after 14 October, such as Erfurt, Halle, Prenzlau, Pasewalk, Stettin, Waren-Nossentin, and Lübeck.

== French Grande Armée ==
Emperor Napoleon I

- Chief of Staff: Marshal Louis Alexandre Berthier

=== Reserve Artillery ===
General of Brigade Guillaume Boivin de la Martiniére

=== Imperial Guard ===
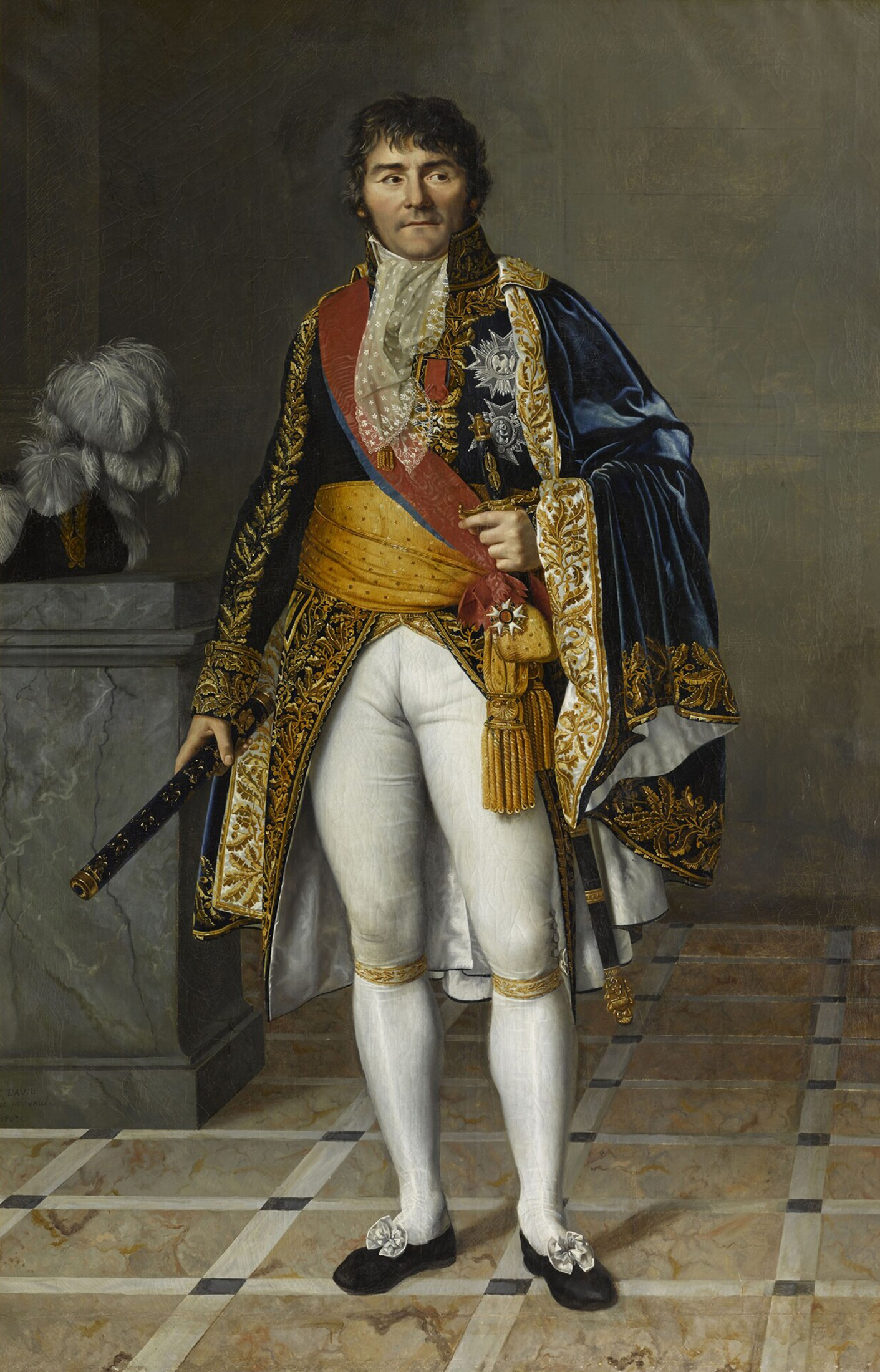
François Joseph Lefebvre

Marshals François Joseph Lefebvre and Jean-Baptiste Bessières (8,725, 42 guns)

- Chief of Staff: General of Brigade François-Xavier Roussel
- Infantry Division: Marshal Lefebvre
  - Brigade: General of Brigade Jerome Soules
    - 1st Chasseurs à Pied Regiment, 1st and 2nd battalions
    - 2nd Chasseurs à Pied Regiment, 1st and 2nd battalions
  - Brigade: General of Brigade Pierre-Augustin Hulin
    - 1st Grenadiers à Pied Regiment, 1st and 2nd battalions
    - 2nd Grenadiers à Pied Regiment, 1st and 2nd battalions
  - Brigade: no commander
    - 1st Dragoons à Pied Regiment, 1st and 2nd battalions
    - 2nd Dragoons à Pied Regiment, 1st and 2nd battalions
- Cavalry Division: Marshal Bessières (2,862)
  - Brigade: Colonel Nicolas Dahlmann
    - Chasseurs à Cheval Regiment
    - Mamelukes, one squadron
  - Brigade: General of Division Frédéric Henri Walther
    - Grenadiers à Cheval Regiment
    - Gendarmes d'Elite, one squadron
- Artillery: General of Brigade Joseph Christophe Couin (712)
  - 1st Foot Artillery Regiment, 2nd and 6th companies
  - 6th Horse Artillery Regiment, detachment
  - 20 8-pound guns, 14 4-pound guns, and eight 6-inch howitzers

=== I Corps ===
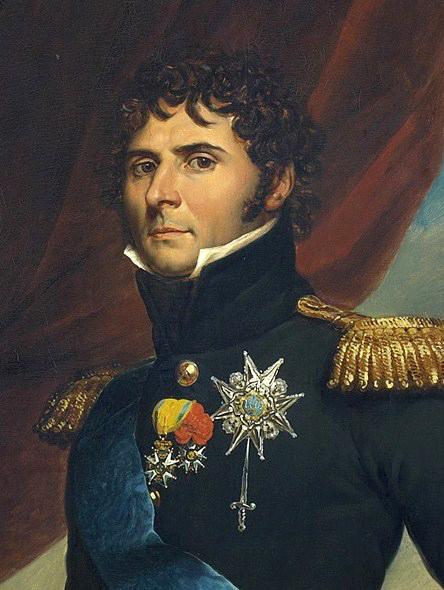
Jean Baptiste Bernadotte

Marshal Jean-Baptiste Bernadotte (21,163, 50 guns)

- Chief of Staff: General of Division Victor Leopold Berthier
- 1st Division: General of Division Pierre Dupont de l'Etang (6,713, 12 guns)
  - Brigade: General of Brigade Marie François Rouyer
    - 9th Light Infantry Regiment, 1st, 2nd, and 3rd battalions
  - Brigade: General of Brigade François Marie Guillaume Legendre d'Harvesse
    - 32nd Line Infantry Regiment, 1st and 2nd battalions
    - 96th Line Infantry Regiment, 1st and 2nd battalions
  - Artillery: Two 12-pound guns, eight 6-pound guns, two 6-inch howitzers
    - 1st Foot Artillery Regiment, 6th and 11th companies
    - 2nd Horse Artillery Regiment, 1st company
- 2nd Division: General of Division Olivier Macoux Rivaud (5,776, 10 guns)
  - Brigade: General of Brigade Michel Marie Pacthod
    - 8th Light Infantry Regiment, 1st and 2nd battalions
  - Brigade: General of Brigade Nicolas Joseph Maison
    - 45th Line Infantry Regiment, 1st and 2nd battalions
    - 54th Line Infantry Regiment, 1st and 2nd battalions
  - Artillery: Four 6-pound guns, four 3-pound guns, two 7-pound howitzers
- 3rd Division: General of Division Jean-Baptiste Drouet (5,978, 16 guns)
  - Brigade: General of Brigade Bernard-Georges-François Frère
    - 27th Light Infantry Regiment, 1st and 2nd battalions
  - Brigade: General of Brigade François Werlé
    - 94th Line Infantry Regiment, 1st and 2nd battalions
    - 95th Line Infantry Regiment, 1st, 2nd, and 3rd battalions
  - Artillery: Eight 6-pound guns, six 3-pound guns, two 6-inch howitzers
- Cavalry Brigade: General of Brigade Jacques Louis François Delaistre de Tilly (1,623)
  - 2nd Hussar Regiment, 1st, 2nd, and 3rd squadrons
  - 4th Hussar Regiment, 1st, 2nd, and 3rd squadrons
  - 5th Chasseurs à Cheval Regiment, 1st, 2nd, and 3rd squadrons
- Corps Artillery: General of Division Jean Baptiste Eblé (1,073 gunners and train)
  - 8th Foot Artillery Regiment, 6th company
  - 3rd Horse Artillery Regiment, 1st company
  - Six 12-pound guns, six 3-pound guns

=== III Corps ===
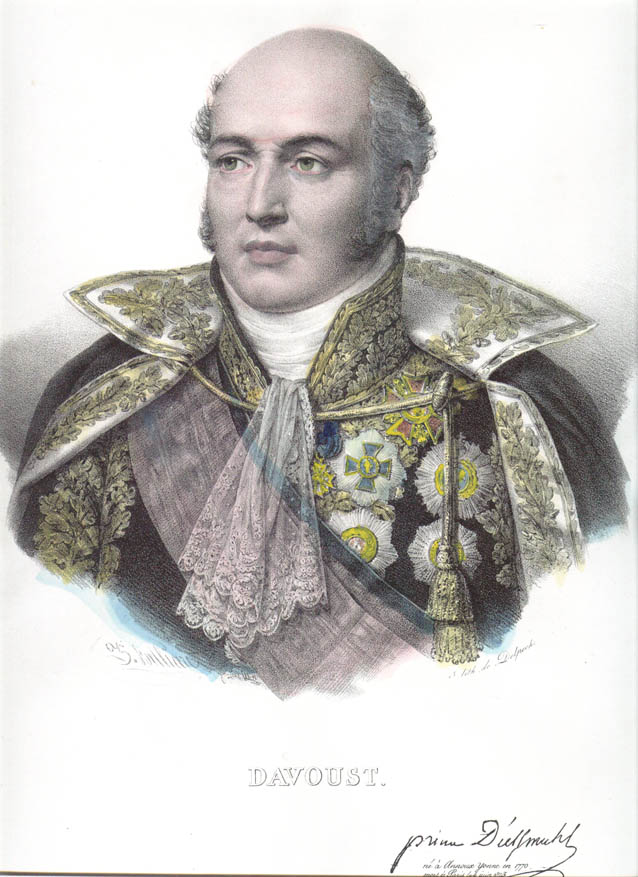
Louis Davout

Marshal Louis Nicolas Davout (28,936, 46 guns)

- Chief of Staff: General of Brigade Joseph Augustin Fournier, Marquis D'Aultanne
- 1st Division: General of Division Charles Antoine Morand (9,867, 13 guns)
  - Brigade: General of Brigade Jean Louis Debilly †
    - 51st Line Infantry Regiment, 1st, 2nd, and 3rd battalions
    - 61st Line Infantry Regiment, 1st, 2nd, and 3rd battalions
  - Brigade: General of Brigade Étienne Brouard
    - 17th Line Infantry Regiment, 1st and 2nd battalions
    - 30th Line Infantry Regiment, 1st and 2nd battalions
  - Brigade: General of Brigade Joseph Bonnet d'Honnières
    - 13th Light Infantry Regiment, 1st and 2nd battalions
  - Artillery: Five 8-pound guns, seven 4-pound guns, one 6-inch howitzer
    - 7th Foot Artillery Regiment, 11th company
- 2nd Division: General of Division Louis Friant (7,293, 8 guns)
  - Brigade: General of Brigade Georges Kister
    - 33rd Line Infantry Regiment, 1st and 2nd battalions
    - 48th Line Infantry Regiment, 1st and 2nd battalions
  - Brigade: General of Brigade Pierre-Charles Lochet
    - 108th Line Infantry Regiment, 1st and 2nd battalions
  - Brigade: General of Brigade Louis Joseph Grandeau
    - 111th Line Infantry Regiment, 1st and 2nd battalions
  - Artillery: Five 8-pound guns, two 4-pound guns, one 6-inch howitzer
    - 7th Foot Artillery Regiment, 2nd company (-)
    - 5th Horse Artillery Regiment, 2nd company (-)
- 3rd Division: General of Division Charles-Étienne Gudin (8,473, 8 guns)
  - Brigade: General of Brigade Claude Petit
    - 12th Line Infantry Regiment, 1st and 2nd battalions
    - 21st Line Infantry Regiment, 1st, 2nd, and 3rd battalions
  - Brigade: General of Brigade Nicolas Hyacinthe Gautier
    - 25th Line Infantry Regiment, 1st and 2nd battalions
    - 85th Line Infantry Regiment, 1st and 2nd battalions
  - Artillery: Five 8-pound guns, two 4-pound guns, one 6-inch howitzer
    - 7th Foot Artillery Regiment, 3rd company (-)
    - 5th Horse Artillery Regiment, 2nd company (-)
- Cavalry Brigade: General of Brigade Jean-Baptiste Théodore Vialanes (1,681)
  - 1st Chasseurs à Cheval Regiment, 1st, 2nd, and 3rd squadrons
  - 2nd Chasseurs à Cheval Regiment, 1st, 2nd, and 3rd squadrons
  - 12th Chasseurs à Cheval Regiment, 1st, 2nd, and 3rd squadrons
- Corps Artillery: General of Brigade Antoine Alexandre Hanicque (1,681 gunners and train)
  - 7th Foot Artillery Regiment, 2nd (-), 3rd (-), and 15th companies
  - 5th Horse Artillery Regiment, 1st company
  - Six 12-pound guns, eight 8-pound guns, three 6-inch howitzers

=== IV Corps ===
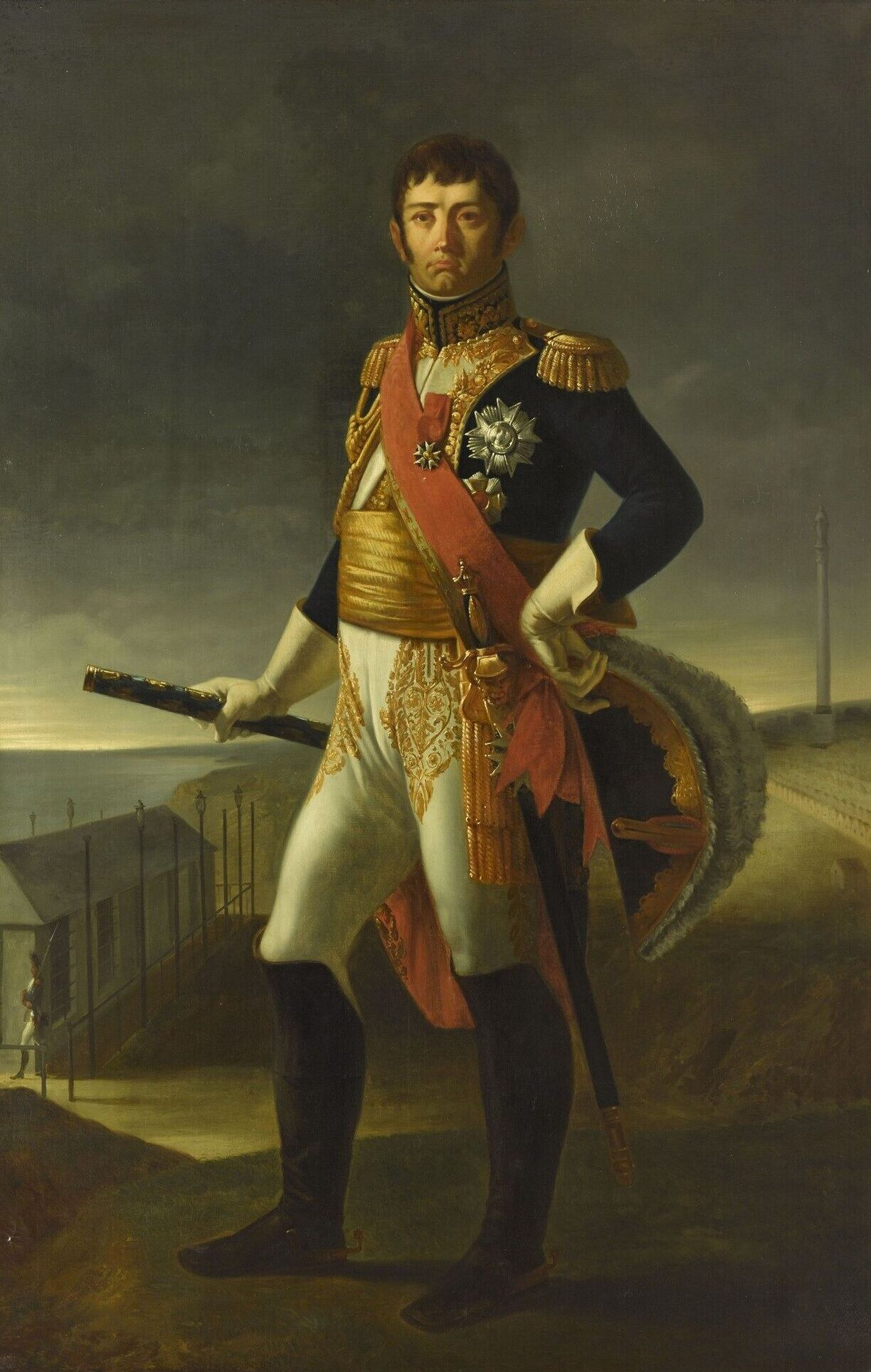
Jean-de-Dieu Soult

Marshal Jean-de-Dieu Soult (28,960, 52 guns)

- Chief of Staff: General of Brigade Jean Dominique Compans
- 1st Division: General of Division Louis Vincent Le Blond de Saint-Hilaire (7,497, 12 guns)
  - Brigade: General of Brigade Jacques de Candras
    - 10th Light Infantry Regiment, 1st and 2nd battalions
    - 35th Line Infantry Regiment, 1st and 2nd battalions
  - Brigade: General of Brigade Louis Prix Waré
    - 43rd Line Infantry Regiment, 1st and 2nd battalions
    - 55th Line Infantry Regiment, 1st and 2nd battalions
  - Artillery: Two 12-pound guns, eight 6-pound guns, two 6-inch howitzers
    - 5th Foot Artillery Regiment, 12th and 17th (-) companies
- 2nd Division: General of Division Jean François Leval (10,176, 12 guns)
  - Brigade: General of Brigade Joseph François Schiner
    - 24th Light Infantry Regiment, 1st and 2nd battalions
  - Brigade: General of Brigade Claude François Ferey
    - 4th Line Infantry Regiment, 1st and 2nd battalions
    - 28th Line Infantry Regiment, 1st and 2nd battalions
  - Brigade: General of Brigade Guillaume Raymond Amant Viviès
    - 46th Line Infantry Regiment, 1st and 2nd battalions
    - 57th Line Infantry Regiment, 1st and 2nd battalions
  - Artillery: Two 12-pound guns, eight 6-pound guns, two 6-inch howitzers
    - 5th Foot Artillery Regiment, 13th and 17th (-) companies
- 3rd Division: General of Division Claude Juste Alexandre Legrand (7,629, 12 guns)
  - Brigade: General of Brigade François Ledru des Essarts
    - 24th Light Infantry Regiment, 1st and 2nd battalions
    - Tirailleurs Corse, one battalion
    - Tirailleurs du Po, one battalion
  - Brigade: General of Brigade Victor Levasseur
    - 18th Line Infantry Regiment, 1st and 2nd battalions
    - 75th Line Infantry Regiment, 1st and 2nd battalions
  - Artillery: Four 12-pound guns, six 6-pound guns, two 6-inch howitzers
    - 5th Foot Artillery Regiment, 14th and 17th (-) companies
- Cavalry Brigade: General of Brigade Pierre Margaron
  - 8th Hussar Regiment, 1st, 2nd, and 3rd squadrons
  - 22nd Chasseurs à Cheval Regiment, 1st, 2nd, and 3rd squadrons
- Cavalry Brigade: General of Brigade Claude-Étienne Guyot
  - 11th Chasseurs à Cheval Regiment, 1st, 2nd, and 3rd squadrons
  - 16th Chasseurs à Cheval Regiment, 1st, 2nd, and 3rd squadrons
- Corps Artillery: Colonel Pierre-Elisabeth Peytes de Montcabrié (1,782 gunners and train)
  - 5th Foot Artillery Regiment, 16th and 17th (-) companies
  - Eight 6-pound guns, two 6-inch howitzers

=== V Corps ===
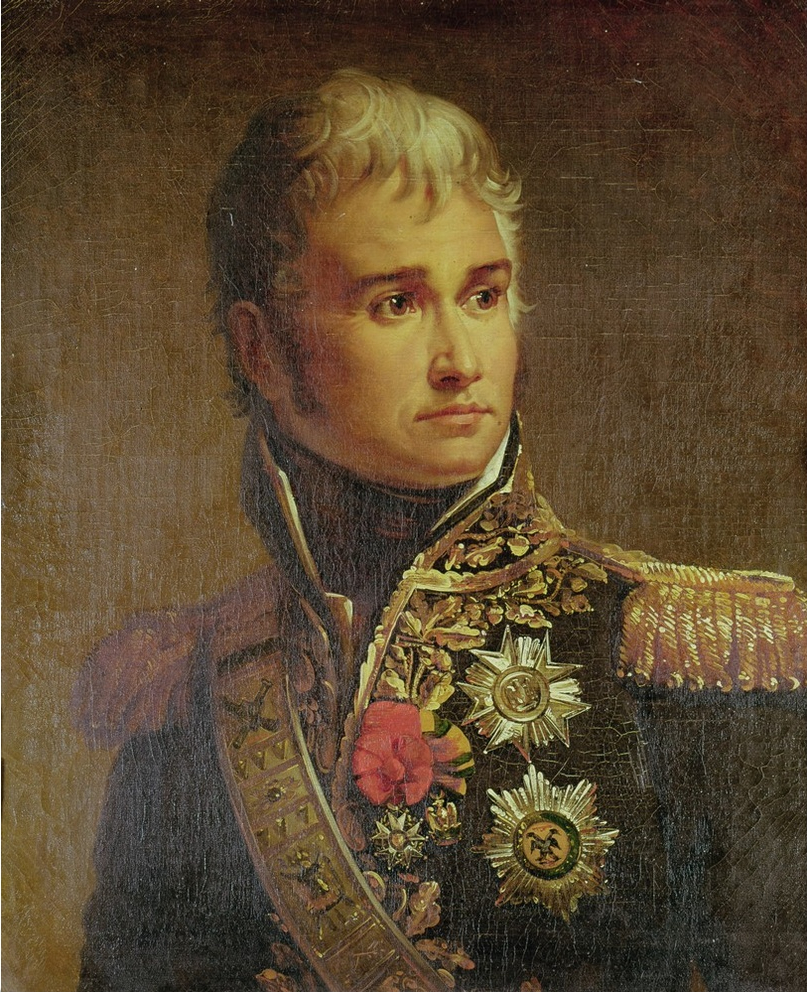
Jean Lannes

Marshal Jean Lannes (21,744, 38 guns)

- Chief of Staff: General of Division Claude Perrin Victor
- 1st Division: General of Division Louis Gabriel Suchet (11,436, 12 guns)
  - Brigade: General of Brigade Michel Marie Claparède
    - 17th Light Infantry Regiment, 1st, 2nd, and 3rd battalions
  - Brigade: General of Brigade Honoré Charles Reille
    - 34th Line Infantry Regiment, 1st, 2nd, 3rd, and 4th battalions
    - 40th Line Infantry Regiment, 1st, 2nd, and 3rd battalions
  - Brigade: General of Brigade Dominique Honoré Antoine Vedel
    - 64th Line Infantry Regiment, 1st, 2nd, and 3rd battalions
    - 88th Line Infantry Regiment, 1st, 2nd, and 3rd battalions
  - Artillery: Two 12-pound guns, six 8-pound guns, two 4-pound guns, two 6-inch howitzers
    - 5th Foot Artillery Regiment, 15th company
    - 3rd Horse Artillery Regiment, 3rd company
- 2nd Division: General of Division Honoré Théodore Maxime Gazan (7,500, 16 guns)
  - Brigade: General of Brigade Jean François Graindorge
    - 21st Light Infantry Regiment, 1st, 2nd, and 3rd battalions
    - 28th Light Infantry Regiment, 1st and 2nd battalions
  - Brigade: General of Brigade François Frédéric Campana
    - 100th Line Infantry Regiment, 1st, 2nd, and 3rd battalions
    - 103rd Line Infantry Regiment, 1st, 2nd, and 3rd battalions
  - Artillery: Two 12-pound guns, eight 6-pound guns, four 3-pound guns, two 6-inch howitzers
    - 1st Foot Artillery Regiment, 5th company
    - 6th Foot Artillery Regiment, 3rd company
- Cavalry Brigade: General of Brigade Anne-François-Charles Trelliard (1,680)
  - 9th Hussar Regiment, 1st, 2nd, and 3rd squadrons
  - 10th Hussar Regiment, 1st, 2nd, and 3rd squadrons
  - 21st Chasseurs à Cheval Regiment, 1st, 2nd, and 3rd squadrons
- Corps Artillery: General of Brigade Louis Foucher de Careil (1,128 gunners and train)
  - 1st Foot Artillery Regiment, 2nd company
  - 6th Horse Artillery Regiment, 3rd company
  - Four 12-pound guns, four 6-pound guns, two 6-inch howitzers

=== VI Corps ===
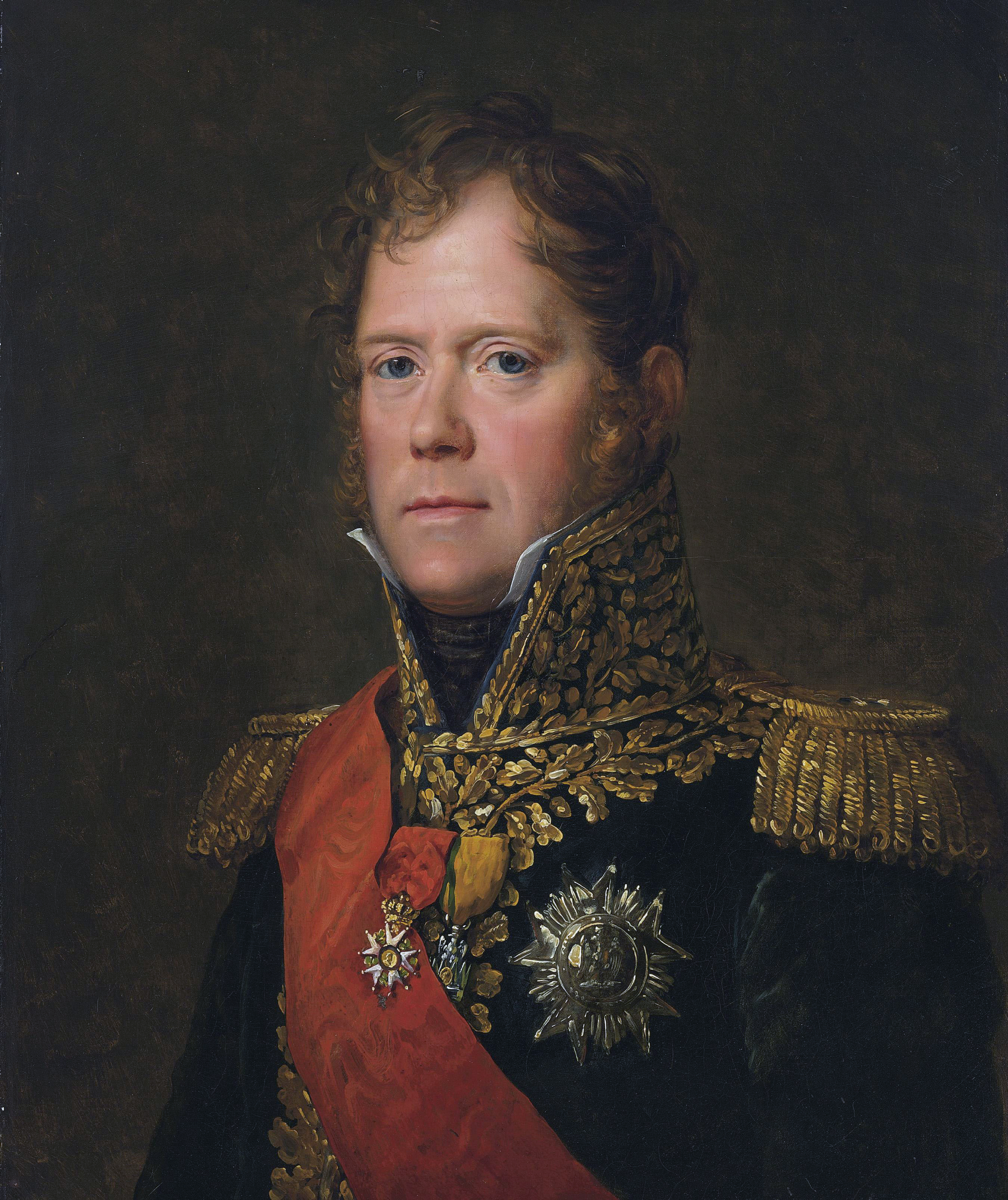
Michel Ney

Marshal Michel Ney (19,267, 24 guns)

- Chief of Staff: General of Brigade Adrien Jean Baptiste Dutaillis
- 1st Division: General of Division Jean Gabriel Marchand
  - Brigade: General of Brigade Eugène-Casimir Villatte
    - 6th Light Infantry Regiment, 1st and 2nd battalions
  - Brigade: General of Brigade François Roguet
    - 39th Line Infantry Regiment, 1st and 2nd battalions
    - 69th Line Infantry Regiment, 1st and 2nd battalions
    - 76th Line Infantry Regiment, 1st and 2nd battalions
- 2nd Division: General of Division Gaspard Amédée Gardanne
  - Brigade: General of Brigade Pierre-Louis Binet de Marcognet
    - 25th Light Infantry Regiment, 1st and 2nd battalions
  - Brigade: General of Brigade Mathieu Delabassée
    - 27th Line Infantry Regiment, 1st and 2nd battalions
    - 50th Line Infantry Regiment, 1st and 2nd battalions
    - 59th Line Infantry Regiment, 1st and 2nd battalions
- Cavalry Brigade: General of Brigade Auguste François-Marie de Colbert-Chabanais (944)
  - 3rd Hussar Regiment, 1st, 2nd, 3rd, and 4th squadrons
  - 10th Chasseurs à Cheval Regiment, 1st, 2nd, 3rd, and 4th squadrons
- Corps Artillery: unknown commander (1,323 gunners and train)
  - Four 12-pound guns, 12 8-pound guns, four 4-pound guns, four 6-inch howitzers
  - 1st Foot Artillery Regiment, 9th, 10th, 11th, and 12th companies
  - 2nd Horse Artillery Regiment, 1st and 5th companies

=== VII Corps ===
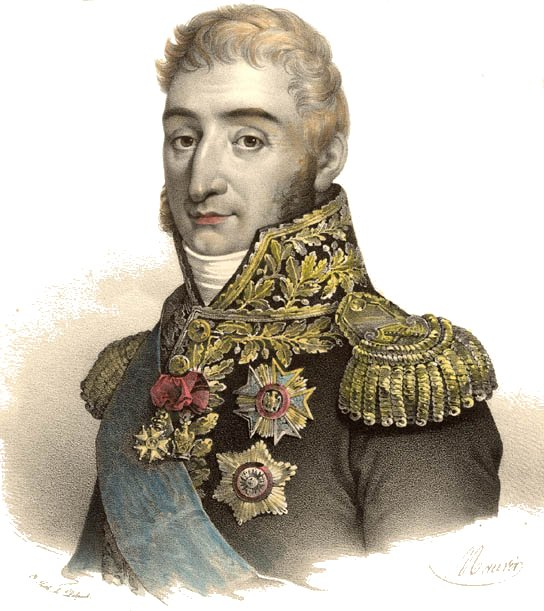
Pierre Augereau

Marshal Pierre Augereau (17,672, 36 guns)

- Chief of Staff: General of Brigade Claude Marie Joseph Pannetier
- 1st Division: General of Division Jacques Desjardin (8,242, 8 guns)
  - Brigade: General of Brigade Pierre Belon Lapisse
    - 16th Light Infantry Regiment, 1st, 2nd, 3rd, and 4th battalions
  - Brigade: General of Brigade Jacques Lefranc
    - 14th Light Infantry Regiment, 2nd battalion
    - 44th Line Infantry Regiment, 1st, 2nd, and 3rd battalions
    - 105th Line Infantry Regiment, 1st, 2nd, and 3rd battalions
  - Artillery: Two 12-pound guns, four 6-pound guns, two 6-inch howitzers
    - 3rd Foot Artillery Regiment, 4th company
    - 6th Horse Artillery Regiment, 2nd company (-)
- 2nd Division: General of Division Étienne Heudelet de Bierre
  - Brigade: General of Brigade François Pierre Joseph Amey
    - 7th Light Infantry Regiment, 1st, 2nd, and 3rd battalions
  - Brigade: General of Brigade Jacques Thomas Sarrut
    - 24th Line Infantry Regiment, 1st, 2nd, and 3rd battalions
    - 63rd Line Infantry Regiment, 1st and 2nd battalions
  - Brigade: Aymé
    - Hesse-Darmstadt Fusilier Regiment, 1st and 2nd battalions
    - Nassau Infantry Regiment, 3rd battalion
  - Artillery: Two 12-pound guns, four 6-pound guns, two 6-inch howitzers
    - 3rd Foot Artillery Regiment, 3rd company
    - 6th Horse Artillery Regiment, 2nd company (-)
- Cavalry Brigade: General of Brigade Antoine Jean Auguste Durosnel (1,290, 4 guns)
  - 7th Chasseurs à Cheval Regiment, 1st, 2nd, 3rd, and 4th squadrons
  - 20th Chasseurs à Cheval Regiment, 1st, 2nd, and 3rd squadrons
  - 6th Horse Artillery Regiment, 5th company, four 4-pound guns
- Corps Artillery: unknown commander (1,323 gunners and train)
  - Four 12-pound guns, 12 8-pound guns, four 4-pound guns, four 6-inch howitzers
  - 1st Foot Artillery Regiment, 9th, 10th, 11th, and 12th companies
  - 2nd Horse Artillery Regiment, 1st and 5th companies

=== Reserve Cavalry ===
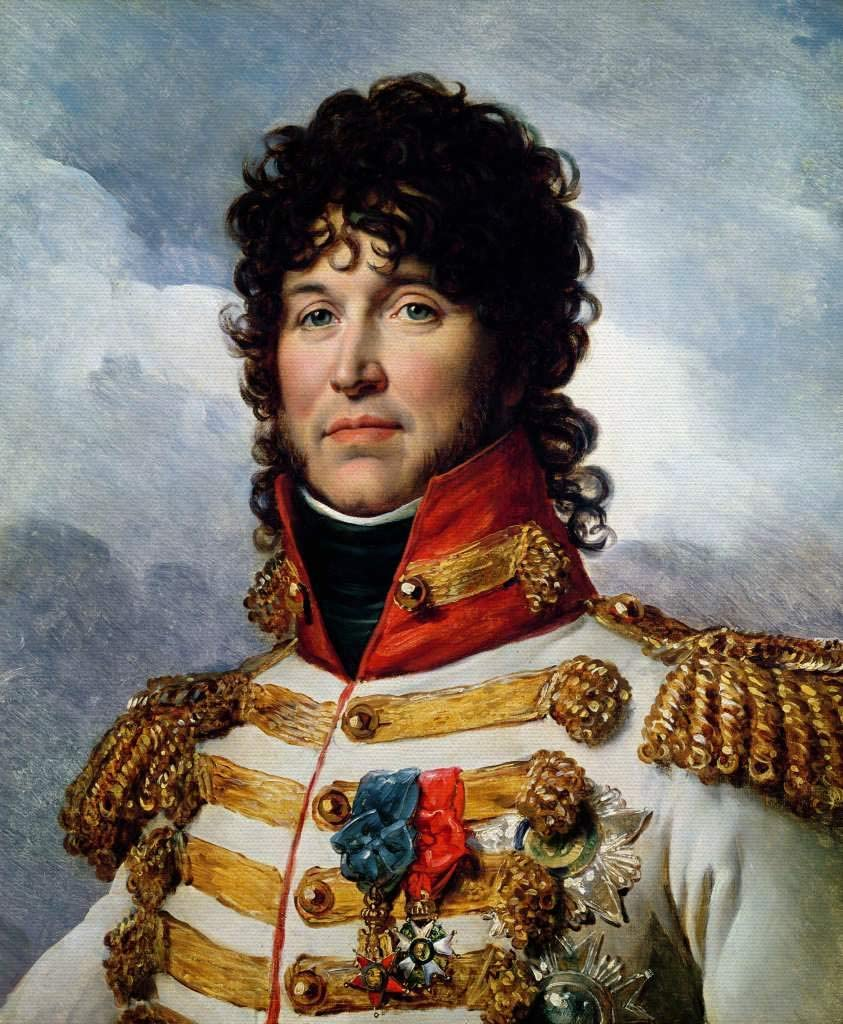
Joachim Murat

Marshal Joachim Murat (19,629, 26 guns)

- Chief of Staff: General of Brigade Augustin Daniel Belliard
- 1st Cuirassier Division: General of Division Étienne Marie Antoine Champion de Nansouty (2,987, 3 guns)
  - Brigade: General of Brigade Jean-Marie Defrance
    - 1e Régiment des Carabinier, 1st, 2nd, 3rd, and 4th squadrons
    - 2ème Régiment des Carabinier, 1st, 2nd, 3rd, and 4th squadrons
  - Brigade: General of Brigade Armand Lebrun de La Houssaye
    - 2nd Cuirassier Regiment, 1st, 2nd, 3rd, and 4th squadrons
    - 9th Cuirassier Regiment, 1st, 2nd, 3rd, and 4th squadrons
  - Brigade: General of Brigade Antoine-Louis Decrest de Saint-Germain
    - 3rd Cuirassier Regiment, 1st, 2nd, 3rd, and 4th squadrons
    - 12th Cuirassier Regiment, 1st, 2nd, 3rd, and 4th squadrons
  - Artillery: 2nd Horse Artillery, 4th company (-), two 6-pound guns, one 6-inch howitzer
- 2nd Cuirassier Division: General of Division Jean-Joseph Ange d'Hautpoul (1,927, 3 guns)
  - Brigade: General of Brigade Jean Christophe Collin Verdière †
    - 1st Cuirassier Regiment, 1st, 2nd, 3rd, and 4th squadrons
    - 5th Cuirassier Regiment, 1st, 2nd, 3rd, and 4th squadrons
  - Brigade: General of Brigade Raymond-Gaspard de Bonardi de Saint-Sulpice
    - 10th Cuirassier Regiment, 1st, 2nd, 3rd, and 4th squadrons
  - Artillery: 2nd Horse Artillery, 4th company (-), two 6-pound guns, one 6-inch howitzer

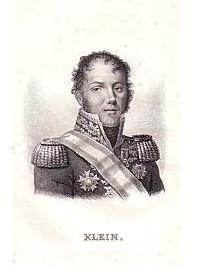
Louis Klein

- 1st Dragoon Division: General of Division Louis Klein (2,401, 3 guns)
  - Brigade: General of Brigade Jacques Étienne de Fornier Fénerolz
    - 1st Dragoon Regiment, 1st, 2nd, and 3rd squadrons
    - 2nd Dragoon Regiment, 1st, 2nd, and 3rd squadrons
  - Brigade: General of Brigade Auguste Étienne Lamotte
    - 4th Dragoon Regiment, 1st, 2nd, 3rd, and 4th squadrons
    - 14th Dragoon Regiment, 1st, 2nd, 3rd, and 4th squadrons
  - Brigade: General of Brigade Joseph Denis Picard
    - 20th Dragoon Regiment, 1st, 2nd, and 3rd squadrons
    - 26th Dragoon Regiment, 1st, 2nd, and 3rd squadrons
  - Artillery: 2nd Horse Artillery, 2nd company (-), two 8-pound guns, one 6-inch howitzer
- 2nd Dragoon Division: General of Division Emmanuel Grouchy (2,915, 3 guns)
  - Brigade: General of Brigade Dominique Mansuy Roget
    - 3rd Dragoon Regiment, 1st, 2nd, and 3rd squadrons
    - 4th Dragoon Regiment, 1st, 2nd, and 3rd squadrons
  - Brigade: General of Brigade Jacques Louis François Milet
    - 10th Dragoon Regiment, 1st, 2nd, and 3rd squadrons
    - 11th Dragoon Regiment, 1st, 2nd, and 3rd squadrons
  - Brigade: General of Brigade André Joseph Boussart
    - 13th Dragoon Regiment, 1st, 2nd, and 3rd squadrons
    - 22nd Dragoon Regiment, 1st, 2nd, and 3rd squadrons
  - Artillery: 2nd Horse Artillery, 2nd company (-), two 8-pound guns, one 6-inch howitzer
- 3rd Dragoon Division: General of Division Marc Antoine de Beaumont (3,055, 3 guns)
  - Brigade: General of Brigade Charles Joseph Boyé
    - 5th Dragoon Regiment, 1st, 2nd, 3rd, and 4th squadrons
    - 8th Dragoon Regiment, 1st, 2nd, 3rd, and 4th squadrons
  - Brigade: General of Brigade Frédéric Christophe Marizy
    - 12th Dragoon Regiment, 1st, 2nd, 3rd, and 4th squadrons
    - 16th Dragoon Regiment, 1st, 2nd, 3rd, and 4th squadrons
  - Brigade: General of Brigade Marie Victor de Fay, marquis de Latour-Maubourg
    - 9th Dragoon Regiment, 1st, 2nd, 3rd, and 4th squadrons
    - 21st Dragoon Regiment, 1st, 2nd, 3rd, and 4th squadrons
  - Artillery: 2nd Horse Artillery, 3rd company (-), two 8-pound guns, one 6-inch howitzer

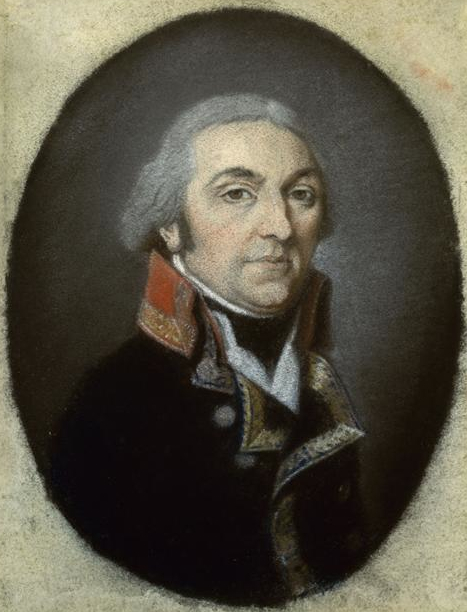
Louis Sahuc

- 4th Dragoon Division: General of Division Louis Michel Antoine Sahuc (3,129, 3 guns)
  - Brigade: General of Brigade Pierre Margaron
    - 17th Dragoon Regiment, 1st, 2nd, and 3rd squadrons
    - 27th Dragoon Regiment, 1st, 2nd, and 3rd squadrons
  - Brigade: General of Brigade Jean-Baptiste Antoine Laplanche
    - 18th Dragoon Regiment, 1st, 2nd, and 3rd squadrons
    - 19th Dragoon Regiment, 1st, 2nd, and 3rd squadrons
  - Brigade: unknown commander
    - 15th Dragoon Regiment, 1st, 2nd, and 3rd squadrons
    - 25th Dragoon Regiment, 1st, 2nd, and 3rd squadrons
  - Artillery: 6th Horse Artillery, 4th company (-), two 8-pound guns, one 6-inch howitzer
- Light Cavalry Division: General of Brigade Antoine Lasalle
  - Light Cavalry Brigade: General of Brigade Lasalle
    - 5th Hussar Regiment, 1st, 2nd, and 3rd squadrons
    - 7th Hussar Regiment, 1st, 2nd, and 3rd squadrons
  - Light Cavalry Brigade: General of Brigade Édouard Jean Baptiste Milhaud
    - 1st Hussar Regiment, 1st, 2nd, and 3rd squadrons
    - 13th Chasseurs à Cheval Regiment, 1st, 2nd, and 3rd squadrons

== Prussian Army ==
Commander-in-chief: King Frederick William III of Prussia

- Chief of Staff General-Major Karl Ludwig von Phull

Second-in-command: Feldmarschall Charles William Ferdinand, Duke of Brunswick

- Chief of Staff: Oberst (Colonel) Gerhard von Scharnhorst
- Unless otherwise noted, regimental guns are not included in the Prussian gun totals.
- When two generals with the same name are candidates for a brigade command, Millar is cited.

=== Brunswick's Main Army ===
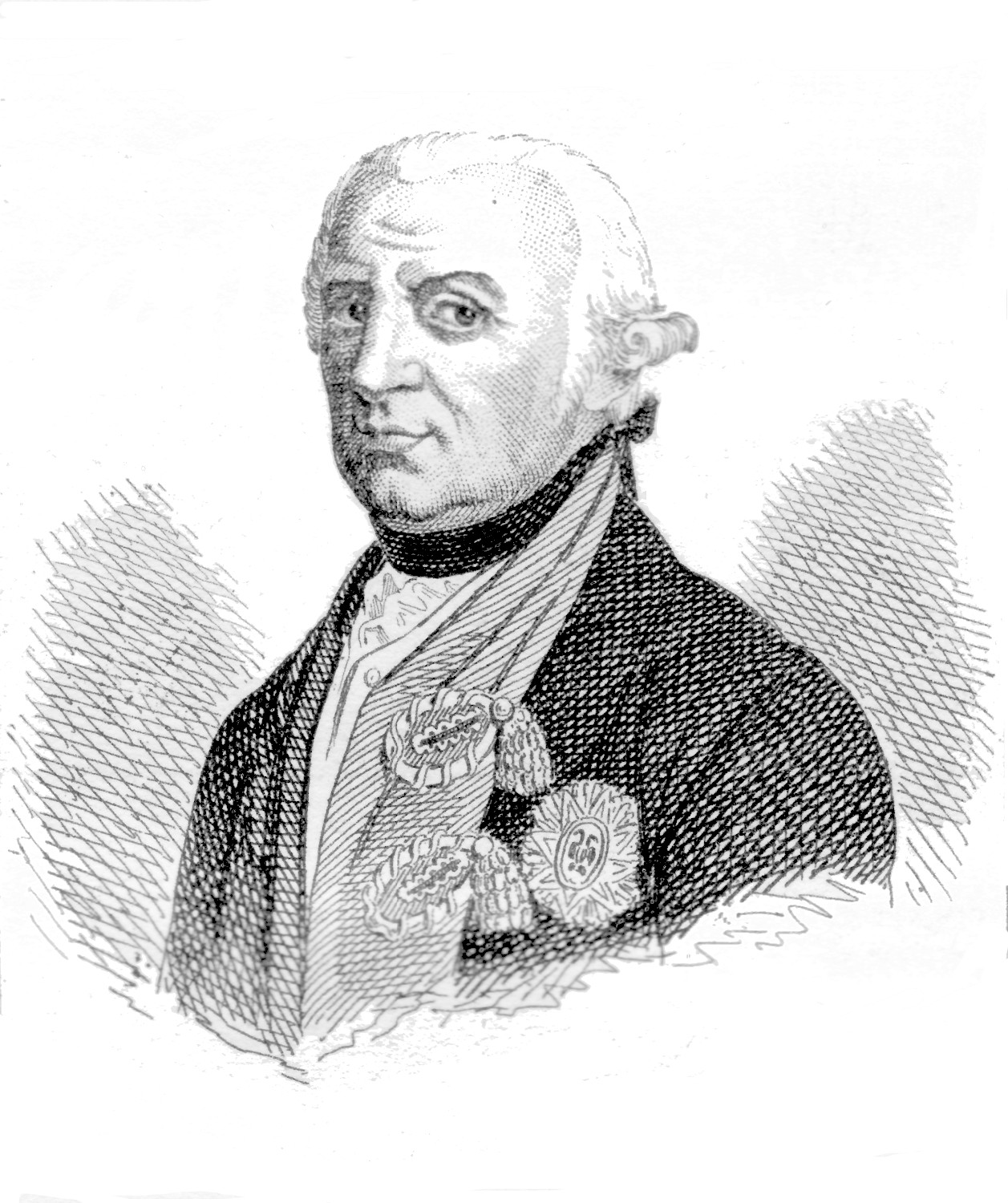
Duke of Brunswick

Duke of Brunswick

- Advance Guard Division: General-Leutnant Gebhard Leberecht von Blücher
  - Strength: 6,000 total, 2,350 infantry, 3,500 cavalry, 150 gunners, 14 guns
  - Brigade: General-Major Friedrich Gottlieb von Oswald (2,350, 6 regimental guns)
    - Weimar Fusilier Battalion
    - Greiffenberg Fusilier Battalion # 4
    - Oswald Fusilier Battalion # 14
    - Kloch Fusilier Battalion # 18
  - Cavalry Brigade: Blücher (3,500, 8 guns)
    - Württemberg Hussar Regiment # 4, ten squadrons
    - Blücher Hussar Regiment # 8, ten squadrons
    - Irwing Dragoon Regiment # 3, five squadrons
    - Schorlemmer Horse Artillery Battery, eight guns
- 1st Division: General-Leutnant Prince William of Orange
  - Strength: 9,200 total, 7,300 infantry, 1,700 cavalry, 200 gunners, 18 guns
  - Brigade: Oberst Prince Henry
    - Rheinbaben Grenadier Battalion
    - Prince Ferdinand Infantry Regiment # 34, two battalions
    - Puttkammer Infantry Regiment # 36, two battalions
    - Riemer Foot Artillery Battery, six 6-pound guns
  - Brigade: Oberst Johann Adolf von Lützow
    - Knebel Grenadier Battalion
    - Möllendorf Infantry Regiment # 25, two battalions
    - Wartensleben Infantry Regiment # 59, two battalions
    - Lehmann Foot Artillery Battery, six 6-pound guns
  - Cavalry Brigade: Oberstleutnant Prince Wilhelm of Prussia
    - Leib Carabinier Regiment # 12, five squadrons
    - Garde du Corps Cuirassier Regiment # 14, five squadrons
    - Willmann Horse Artillery Battery, six 4-pound guns
- 2nd Division: General-Leutnant Leopold Alexander von Wartensleben
  - Strength: 10,300 total, 8,300 infantry, 1,800 cavalry, 200 gunners, 18 guns
  - Brigade: General-Major Karl Alexander von Wedel
    - Hanstein Grenadier Battalion
    - Renouard Infantry Regiment # 3, two battalions
    - Kleist Infantry Regiment # 5, two battalions
    - Wilkins Foot Artillery battery, six 8-pound guns
  - Brigade: General-Major Johann Jeremias von Renouard
    - Alt-Braun Grenadier Battalion
    - Prince Louis Infantry Regiment # 20, two battalions
    - Brunswick Infantry Regiment # 21, two battalions
    - Lange Foot Artillery Battery, six 8-pound guns
  - Cavalry Brigade: General-Major Christan Heinrich von Quitzow (1,800, 6 guns)
    - Quitzow Cuirassier Regiment # 6, five squadrons
    - Reitzenstein Cuirassier Regiment # 7, five squadrons
    - Merkatz Horse Artillery Battery, six 4-pound guns
- 3rd Division: General-Leutnant Friedrich Wilhelm Carl von Schmettau † (vice Scharnhorst)
  - Strength: 11,500 total, 8,600 infantry, 2,700 cavalry, 200 gunners, 18 guns
  - Brigade: General-Major Ludolph August Friedrich von Alvensleben
    - Schack Grenadier Battalion
    - Alvensleben Infantry Regiment # 33, two battalions
    - Prince Heinrich Infantry Regiment # 35, two battalions
    - Röhl Foot Artillery Battery, six 8-pound guns
  - Brigade: General-Major Dietrich Lebrecht von Schimonsky
    - Krafft Grenadier Battalion
    - Malschitsky Infantry Regiment # 28, two battalions
    - Schimonsky Infantry Regiment # 40, two battalions
    - Stankar Foot Artillery Battery, six 8-pound guns
  - Cavalry Brigade: General-Major Friedrich Daniel Wilhelm von Irwing
    - Königin Dragoon Regiment # 5, ten squadrons
    - Graumann Horse Artillery Battery, six guns
  - Cavalry Brigade: General-Major Karl Wilhelm von Bünting
    - Heising Cuirassier Regiment # 8, five squadrons
    - Bünting Cuirassier Regiment # 12, five squadrons

=== Kalckreuth's Reserve Corps ===
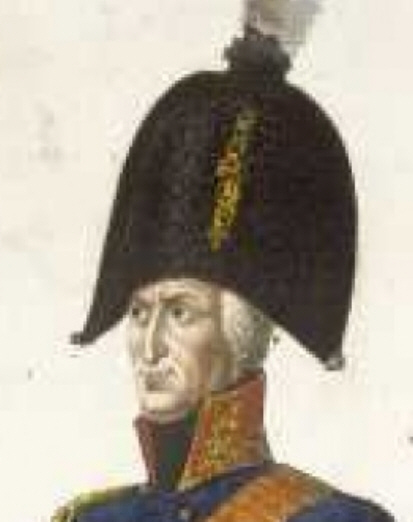
General Kalckreuth

General of Infantry Friedrich Adolf, Count von Kalckreuth

- Strength: 15,750 total, 13,000 infantry, 2,550 cavalry, 200 gunners, 31 guns
- The Reserve Corps was attached to the Main Army.
- 1st Division: General-Leutnant Johann Ernst von Kühnheim
  - Strength: 7,400 total, 2,550 cavalry, 15 guns
  - Brigade: Oberst August Wilhelm von Pletz
    - Rabiel Grenadier battalion
    - Prince August Grenadier battalion
    - König Infantry Regiment # 18, two battalions
    - Alkier Howitzer Battery, six 6-inch howitzers
  - Brigade: General-Major Karl Friedrich von Hirschfeld
    - Grenadier Garde Infantry Regiment # 6, one battalion
    - Leib Garde Battalion
    - Guard Infantry Regiment # 15, two battalions
    - Faber Foot Artillery Battery, three 8-pound guns
  - Cavalry Brigade: Oberst Karl Friedrich Hermann von Beeren
    - Beeren Cuirassier Regiment # 2, five squadrons
    - Gensdarmes Cuirassier Regiment # 10, five squadrons
    - Garde du Corps Cuirassier Regiment # 13, five squadrons
    - Scholten Horse Artillery Battery, six 4-pound guns
- 2nd Division: General-Leutnant Alexander Wilhelm von Arnim
  - Strength: 8,800 total, 16 guns
  - Brigade: General-Major Johann Matthias von Malschitsky
    - Schlieffen Grenadier battalion
    - Hülsen Grenadier battalion
    - Zenge Infantry Regiment # 24, two battalions
    - Bychelberg Foot Artillery Battery, eight 8-pound guns
  - Brigade: General-Major August Wilhelm Hermann von Zenge
    - Gaudy Grenadier battalion
    - Osten Grenadier battalion
    - Arnim Infantry Regiment # 13, two battalions
    - Pirch Infantry Regiment # 22, two battalions
    - Heiden Foot Artillery Battery, eight 8-pound guns

=== Hohenlohe's Army ===
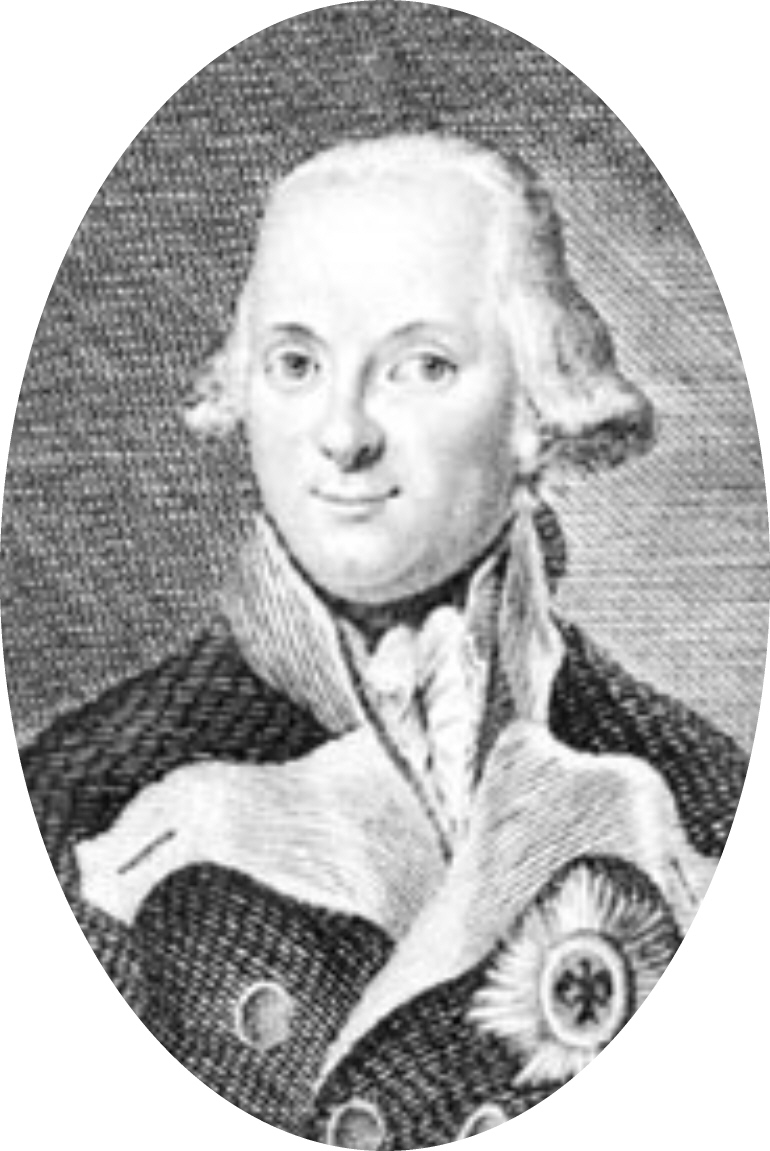
Prince Hohenlohe

General of Infantry Frederick Louis, Prince of Hohenlohe-Ingelfingen

- Chief of Staff: Oberst Christian Karl August Ludwig von Massenbach
- Advance Guard Division: General-Leutnant Prince Louis Ferdinand † (vice Grawert)
  - Strength: 8,300 at Saalfeld, 5,300 at Jena, 33 of 44 guns lost at Saalfeld including regimental guns
  - Brigade: General-Major Friedrich Joseph von Bevilaqua
    - Müffling Infantry Regiment # 49, two battalions
    - Prince Clemens Saxon Infantry Regiment, two battalions
    - Kürfurst Saxon Infantry Regiment, two battalions
    - Hoyer Foot Artillery Battery, six 4-pound guns
  - Brigade: General-Major Karl von Pelet
    - Rabenau Fusilier Battalion # 13
    - Pelet Fusilier Battalion # 14
    - Rühle Fusilier Battalion # 15
    - Masars and Valentin Foot Jäger companies
    - Reimann Foot Artillery Battery, six 6-pound guns
  - Cavalry Brigade: General-Major Christian Ludwig Schimmelpfennig von der Oye
    - Schimmelpfennig Hussar Regiment # 6, ten squadrons
    - Gause Horse Artillery Battery # 2, eight 6-pound guns
  - Cavalry Brigade: General-Major Friedrich Traugott von Trützschler
    - Saxon Hussar Regiment, eight squadrons
- 1st Division: General-Leutnant Julius von Grawert
  - Strength: 9,630 total, 7,500 infantry, 1,900 cavalry, 230 gunners, 22 guns
  - Brigade: General-Major Johann Friedrich Wilhelm von Müffling
    - Hahn Grenadier battalion (29/32)
    - Hohenlohe Infantry Regiment # 32, two battalions
    - Sanitz Infantry Regiment # 50, two battalions
    - Giasenapp Foot Artillery battery # 7, six 12-pound guns
  - Brigade: General-Major Christian Friedrich von Schimonsky
    - Sack Grenadier battalion (33/42)
    - Grawert Infantry Regiment # 37, two battalions
    - Zastrow Infantry Regiment # 39, two battalions
    - Wolframsdorf Foot Artillery battery # 8, six 12-pound guns
  - Cavalry: General-Leutnant Friedrich Jacob von Holtzendorff
  - Cavalry Brigade: General-Major Elias Maximilian von Henckel
    - Krafft Dragoon Regiment # 11, five squadrons
    - Henkel Cuirassier Regiment # 1, five squadrons
    - Holtzendorff Cuirassier Regiment # 9, five squadrons
    - Steinwehr Horse Artillery battery # 9, six 6-pound guns
  - Light Brigade: Oberst von Erichsen
    - Erichsen Fusilier battalion # 10
    - Gettkandt Hussar Regiment # 1, ten squadrons
    - Studnitz Prussian Horse Artillery battery # 14 (-), four 4-pound guns
- 2nd (Saxon) Division: General der Kavallerie Hans Gottlob von Zeschwitz
  - Strength: 9,750 total, 8,200 infantry, 1,250 cavalry, 300 gunners, 41 guns
  - Brigade: General-Major von Burgsdorff
    - Thümmel Saxon Infantry Regiment, two battalions
    - Prince Xavier Saxon Infantry Regiment, two battalions
    - Haussmar Saxon Foot Artillery battery, eight 12-pound guns
    - Ernst Saxon Foot Artillery battery, eight 12-pound guns
  - Brigade: General-Major von Dyherrn
    - Low Saxon Infantry Regiment, two battalions
    - Niesemeuschel Saxon Infantry Regiment, two battalions
    - Bevilaqua Saxon Infantry Regiment, 2nd battalion
    - Bonniot Saxon Foot Artillery battery # 8, ten 12-pound guns
  - Cavalry Brigade: General-Leutnant von Kochtitsky (General-Leutnant Joachim Friedrich von Zeschwitz)
    - Mounted Carabinier Saxon Regiment, four squadrons
    - Kochtitsky Saxon Cuirassier Regiment, four squadrons
    - Prince Albert Saxon Chevau-léger Regiment, four squadrons
    - Grossman Saxon Horse Artillery battery, ten guns
  - Light Brigade: General-Leutnant von Polenz (Oberst Karl Anton Andreas von Boguslawsky)
    - Boguslawsky Prussian Fusilier battalion # 22
    - Polenz Saxon Chevau-léger Regiment, four squadrons
    - Studnitz Prussian Horse Artillery battery # 14 (-), five guns
- Reserve Division: General-Leutnant Wolfgang Moritz von Prittwitz
  - 8,090 total, 6,900 infantry, 1,000 cavalry, 190 gunners, 23 guns in batteries
  - Brigade: General-Major Karl Wilhelm von Sanitz
    - Losthin Grenadier Battalion (38/49)
    - Dohna Grenadier Battalion (40/43)
    - Borck Grenadier Battalion (28/50)
    - Kollin Grenadier Battalion (39)
    - Schulenburg Foot Artillery Battery, eight 12-pound guns
  - Brigade: General-Major Heinrich von Cerrini di Monte Varchi
    - Thiolaz Saxon Grenadier Battalion
    - Lecoq Saxon Grenadier Battalion
    - Liechtenhayn Saxon Grenadier Battalion
    - Metzsch Saxon Grenadier Battalion
    - Hundt Saxon Grenadier Battalion
    - Thullmann Foot Artillery Battery, eight guns
  - Brigade: General-Major August Friedrich Erdmann von Krafft (1,000, 7 guns)
    - Prittwitz Dragoon Regiment # 2, five squadrons
    - Prince Johann Saxon Chevau-léger Regiment, four squadrons
    - Hahn Horse Artillery Battery, seven guns
- Left Flank Corps: General-Major Bogislav Friedrich Emanuel von Tauentzien
  - Strength: 6,300 total, 6 guns
  - Brigade: General-Major Johann Christian von Zweiffel
    - Herwarth 1/2 Grenadier Battalion #45, two companies
    - Zweiffel Infantry Regiment # 46, two battalions
  - Brigade: General-Major von Schöneberg
    - Winkel Saxon Grenadier Battalion
    - Rechten Saxon Infantry Regiment, two battalions
    - Prince Maximilian Saxon Infantry Regiment, two battalions
    - Kotsch Howitzer Battery, six howitzers
  - Light Brigade: General-Major Rudolph Ernst Christoph von Bila
    - Rosen Fusilier Battalion # 7
    - Werner and Kronheim Foot Jäger companies
    - Prince Clement Saxon Chevau-léger Regiment, four squadrons
    - Bila Hussar Regiment # 11, five squadrons

=== Rüchel's Corps ===
General of Infantry Ernst von Rüchel

- Strength: 15,000 total, 12,700 infantry, 2,300 cavalry, 450 gunners, 40 guns
- Generals Winning and Saxe-Weimar both missed Jena-Auerstedt while on detached duty.
- Advance Guard Division: General-Leutnant Christian Ludwig von Winning
  - Brigade: Winning
    - Kaiserlingk Fusilier Battalion # 1
    - Bila Fusilier Battalion # 2
    - Tschammer Infantry Regiment # 27, two battalions
    - Two Foot Jäger companies
    - 6-pounder Foot Artillery Battery # 19, approx. eight guns
    - Neander Horse Artillery Battery # 12, approx. eight guns
  - Brigade: General-Major Karl Georg Friedrich von Wobeser
    - Ernst Fusilier Battalion # 19
    - One Foot Jäger company
    - Wobeser Dragoon Regiment # 14, five squadrons
    - Lehmann Horse Artillery Battery # 4 (-), four 4-pound guns
- Corps de Bataille: General Karl August, Grand Duke of Saxe-Weimar-Eisenach
  - 1st Brigade: unknown commander
    - Borstell Grenadier Battalion
    - Schenck Infantry Regiment # 9, two battalions
    - Winning Infantry Regiment # 23, two battalions
  - 2nd Brigade: unknown commander
    - Hellmann Grenadier Battalion
    - Treuenfels Infantry Regiment # 29, two battalions
    - Strachwitz Infantry Regiment # 43, two battalions
  - 3rd Brigade: unknown commander
    - Sobbe Fusilier Battalion # 18
    - Wedell Infantry Regiment # 10, two battalions
    - Tschepe Infantry Regiment # 37, two battalions
  - Cavalry Brigade: unknown commander
    - Bailliodz Cuirassier Regiment # 5, five squadrons
    - Katte Dragoon Regiment # 4, five squadrons
  - Corps Artillery: unknown commander
    - Kirchfeld Foot Artillery Regiment # 16, approx. 8 guns
    - Schaefer Foot Artillery Regiment # 17, approx. 8 guns
    - Horse Artillery Battery # 11, four guns

=== Württemberg's Reserve ===
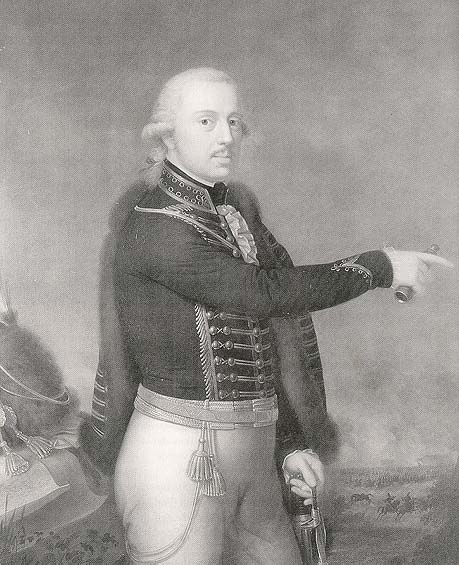
Duke of Württemberg

General Eugene Frederick Henry, Duke of Württemberg

- Strength: 16,000 total, 32 guns in batteries, 26 regimental guns
- The Reserve missed Jena-Auerstedt.
- Advance Guard Division: General-Major Johann von Hinrichs
  - Borstell Fusilier Battalion # 9
  - Knorr Fusilier Battalion # 12
  - Hinrichs Fusilier Battalion # 17
  - Hertzberg Dragoon Regiment # 9, one squadron
  - Katte Dragoon Regiment # 10, one squadron
  - Usedom Hussar Regiment # 10, two squadrons
  - Horse Artillery Battery (-), two guns
- 1st Division: General-Major Hans Christoph von Natzmer
  - Schmeling Grenadier Battalion
  - Crety Grenadier Battalion
  - Treskow Infantry Regiment # 17, two battalions
  - Kauffberg Infantry Regiment # 51, two battalions
  - Natzmer Infantry Regiment # 54, two battalions
  - One and one-half Foot Artillery Batteries, 12 guns
- 2nd Division: General-Major Balthasar Wilhelm Christoph von Larisch (Jung-Larisch)
  - Vieregg Grenadier Battalion
  - Kalckreuth Infantry Regiment # 4, two battalions
  - Jung-Larisch Infantry Regiment # 53, two battalions
  - Manstein Infantry Regiment # 55, two battalions
  - One and one-half Foot Artillery Batteries, 12 guns
- Reserve Cavalry: unknown commander
  - Hertzberg Dragoon Regiment # 9, four squadrons
  - Katte Dragoon Regiment # 10, four squadrons
  - Usedom Hussar Regiment # 10, eight squadrons
  - Horse Artillery Battery (-), six guns

== External references ==
The following websites are excellent sources for the full names of French and Prussian generals.

- Broughton, Tony. napoleon-series.org Generals Who Served in the French Army during the Period 1792-1815
- (in German) Montag, Reinhard. lexikon-deutschegenerale.de Lexikon der Deutschen Generale
