= Battle of Halle (disambiguation) =

The term Battle of Halle can refer to the following military combats that occurred at Halle (Saale):

- Battle of Halle (1806) during the War of the Fourth Coalition, a French victory over the Prussians
- Battle of Halle (1813) during the War of the Sixth Coalition, a Prussian victory over the French
