= Jean Pierre Lanabère =

Jean Pierre Lanabère Baron de l'Empire
- Born: December 24, 1770; Carresse-Cassaber, France
- Died: September 16, 1812 (aged 41); Mozhaysk, Russia
- Military career
- Allegiance: France
- Branch: Infantry
- Service years: 1791–1812
- Rank: General of Brigade
- Conflicts: French Revolutionary Wars; Napoleonic Wars
- Awards: Légion d'Honneur

Jean Pierre Lanabère, (French pronunciation: [ʒɑ̃ pjɛʁ lanabɛʁ]) born on December 24, 1770, at Carresse-Cassaber. and died on September 16, 1812, in Mozhaysk, Russia. Lanabère was born a son to a lawyer and a notary. He was a French general of the First French Empire during the Napoleonic Wars.

== Life of Service ==
Lanabère enlisted on October 23, 1791, as a lieutenant in the 3rd battalion of volunteers of the Lower Pyrenees. In 1792 he was promoted to captain and he served in the Armée du Sud. After he soon had to pass the Adjutant Major Captain in the Armée du Midi, on March 24, 1792. The following year Lanabère took command of a company of chasseurs and joined the Armée des Pyrénées occidentales. On August 7, 1793, he commanded an outpost at Kurutxamendi near Saint-Jean-Pied-de-Port, when he was ordered to carry 100 men to the foot of the mountain of Iralepo. He remained with that army unit until September of 1795 when he joined the Armée de l'Ouest. In 1800 Lanabère served with the Army of the Reserve in Chabran's division. He recognized the Spaniards who built a redoubt at the top. Arrived at their destination, his ardour prevails and with simple recognition, he performs a serious attack for half an hour. Jean climbs the mountain under the fire of the enemy, attacks the entrenchments, and jumps one of the first in the redoubt. The Spaniards escaped into a second entrenchment, he chased them and destroyed all of their evidence. This action was further led by General Servan.

He became Adjutant Major on April 29, 1794, and later entered the West. He entered Italy in the year VIII with the 70th Infantry Brigade, which was part of the Army Reserve. He was at the crossing of the Ticino and the capture of Turbigo on May 31, 1800, and at Marengo on June 14, 1800. This battle between the French and the Austrian forces was a point where Jean was more noticed for his military tactics. He was promoted soon after to Battalion Commander on July 19, 1800, by the General-in-Chief of the Army of Italy, his rank was confirmed on February 8, 1801. He was knighted to the Legion of Honor on June 14, 1804, at the Brest camp. He made the campaign of the year XIV and embarked on the fleet of Belle Isle. During the years of peace that followed, Lanabère served at the camp of Brest. In 1805 he embarked on the fleet of Belle-Isle and then in May of 1806 he joined the Chasseurs à Pied of the Imperial Guard. On August 1, 1806, he was appointed battalion commander in the Foot Guards of the Imperial Guard and was in the battles of Jena on October 14, 1806, Eylau on February 8, 1807, and Friedland on June 14, 1807. He was appointed colonel major on March 12, 1808, to the 1st regiment of fighter riflemen of the Imperial Guard, and he received the cross of an officer of the Legion of Honor on September 4.

Returning to the Armée d'Allemagne, he had his right arm fractured at the battle of Essling on May 22, 1809. He was made commander of the Legion of Honor on June 5, 1809, and was created a baron of the Empire on June 4, 1810. Lanabère served in the campaigns that followed and fought at major battles including Jena, Eylau, and Friedland. In 1808 he was named colonel-major of the 1st Fusiliers-Chasseurs of the Imperial Guard and a Knight of the Empire. After serving in Spain, in 1809 Lanabère took part in the Danube campaign and fought at the Battle of Aspern-Essling. In recognition of his services, he was named a Commander of the Legion of Honor and then in 1810 a Baron of the Empire. Lanabère served in Spain in 1810 and then in 1811, he was promoted to général de brigade. For the Russian campaign of 1812, Lanabère took command of the 2nd Brigade of the 2nd Division of the Young Guard. During the Battle of Borodino, General Morand was wounded and out of action, and Lanabère was ordered to take command of Morand's division. Lanabère took command of the division and then amid battle was fatally wounded. He died from his wounds nine days later. For his bravery and legacy, his name is engraved on the Arc de Triomphe, East pillar, 19th column. This legacy has a variety of medals and promotions. This bravery and honor in the military affected it positively by developing a sense of hope in the armies.
