= Combat of Turbigo =

1800 battle between French and Austrian forces

- Part of the War of the Second Coalition
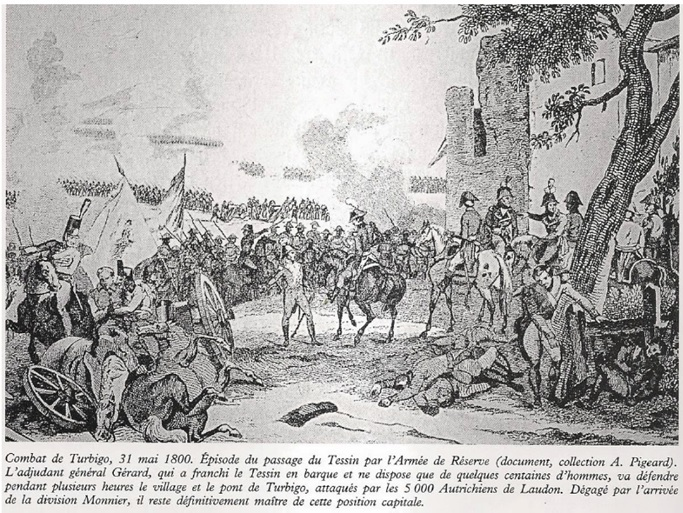
- Combat of Turbigo
| Date | 31 May 1800 |
| Location | Turbigo, Province of Milan, Lombardy 45.52814805°N 8.73300433°E |
| Result | French victory |

Belligerents
| France | Austria |

Commanders and leaders
| Napoleon Bonaparte | Johann Ludwig Alexander von Laudon |

Strength
| Unknown | Unknown |

Casualties and losses
| Unknown | 300 killed 300 wounded 400 captured |

The combat of Turbigo was a military engagement of the War of the Second Coalition that took place on 31 May 1800 (11 Prairial VIII) in Turbigo between Austrian and French forces, the latter coming from Piedmont after crossing the Alps.

== Background ==
On 30 May 1800 (10 Prairial) the French soldiers of the Boudet division entered Novara. On the same day, General Duhesme took up position with the Boudet and Loison divisions on the banks of the Ticino river: the Boudet division was placed in front of Trecate and that of Loison in Vigevano and surroundings. On May 31, 1800 (11 Prairial) Napoleon Bonaparte was in Novara. Bonaparte, First Consul at the time, exploited the uncertainty of his adversaries and set off towards the Ticino.

== Passage over Ticino river in Turbigo ==
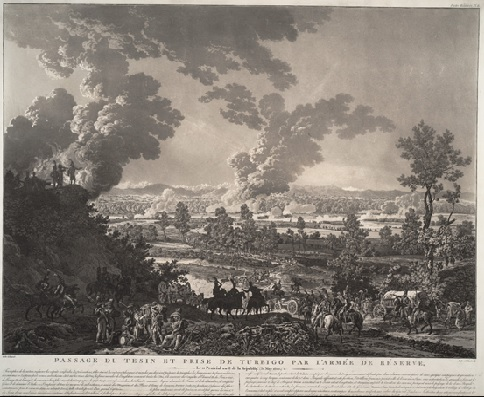
Murat, under Napoleon's eyes, crossed the Ticino

On 31 May, Murat, under Napoleon's eyes, crossed the Ticino, while Duhesme began to cross the river in Boffalora sopra Ticino. Murat's vanguard was already in Galliate early in the morning. The Austrians, positioned on the opposite side of the Ticino, facing Galliate, were very well entrenched and defended the position with several artillery pieces. Rifle fire from the French ranks triggered an immediate reaction by the Austrian cannons. The French light artillery, consisting only of two 4-pound pieces served by the gunners of the guard, in the presence of Napoleon himself, to the sound of the drums, very well supported the attempt by the French infantry to cross the river via rafts and four or five boats recovered on the spot, so much that they forced the Austrians to abandon the defensive positions on the opposite side of the river.

== Fighting and taking of Turbigo ==
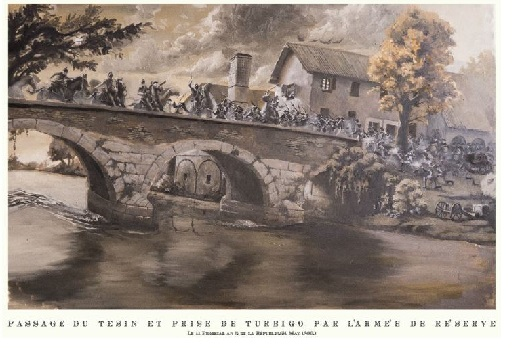
The French infantry rejects the last charge of the Austrian cavalry on the bridge of the Naviglio Grande in Turbigo (painting made for the 220th anniversary of the battle)

The Austrians quickly evacuated the side of the Ticino river and reorganized themselves to defend the bridge over the Naviglio Grande at the entrance to the town of Turbigo, a bridge on which numerous barricades were built. In the meantime, the Austrian Johann Ludwig Alexander von Laudon arrived in Turbigo himself, with numerous reinforcements, especially cavalry. His position, although formidable, was soon attacked by the Monnier division, with the 70th demi-brigade, which formed the vanguard and to which many soldiers of the 72nd demi-brigade who had crossed the river had joined. The Austrians lost 700 men in this action, 400 of whom were taken prisoner. General Guénand, with his demi-brigade, took up a position in front of Turbigo. The Austrians attempted several cavalry charges to regain control of the bridge over the Naviglio Grande but all failed. In the end, the Austrian cavalry suffered over 300 casualties. In this juncture, the citizen Jacques Baptiste Louis Morin, injured in the arm, was promoted in the field, by Napoleon himself, "cavalry squadron leader" and the citizen Jean Pierre Lanabère would later reach the rank of general (he lost his life heroically during the 1812 Russian campaign). At 10 pm the village of Turbigo, completely burned, finally fell into the hands of the French troops. The night and the effort did not immediately allow the French to chase the enemy retreating towards Milan. Turbigo was raked house by house the whole night to extinguish the last Austrian resistance that had occupied the whole town. On June 1 (12 Prairial) Napoleon Bonaparte was in Turbigo. Early in the morning, while still in Novara, he wrote to General Lannes informing him of the victory over Ticino (Bulletin No. 5389 "Correspondance générale de Napoléon Bonaparte").

== Conclusion of the clashes and entry into Milan ==
On 2 June (13 Prairial), early in the morning in Turbigo, where he slept, Napoleon can breathe more freely. Already the day before, Murat and Boudet had taken the road to Milan. Murat, with all his cavalry, the nineteenth and thirtieth demi-brigades, made a forced march to reach the enemy, who had fled in the direction of Milan with such rapidity that he could not reach them. The relentless pursuit by Murat ended at the gates of the city, which surrendered without bloodshed. On 2 June 1800 at 2 pm, Bonaparte with his advisers Petiet and Bourrienne, set off from Turbigo, in a carriage, to enter Milan in triumph.

== Curiosity ==
Another battle took place in Turbigo in 1859 during the Second Italian War of Independence, once again fought between the French and the Austrians, the so-called "Battle of Turbigo". In Turbigo there is a museum that collects information on the facts dating back to the passage over the Ticino river.
