= Nicolas Hyacinthe Gautier =

French general (1774–1809)

Nicolas Hyacinthe Gautier (French pronunciation: [nikɔlɑ jasɛ̃t ɡotje]; 1774, Loudéac–1809) was a French general of the Napoleonic Wars.

He was fatally injured at the Battle of Wagram, and died in Vienna a week later.

His name is inscribed on column 18 of the Arc de Triomphe.
