= Olivier Macoux Rivaud de la Raffinière =

French general (1766–1839)

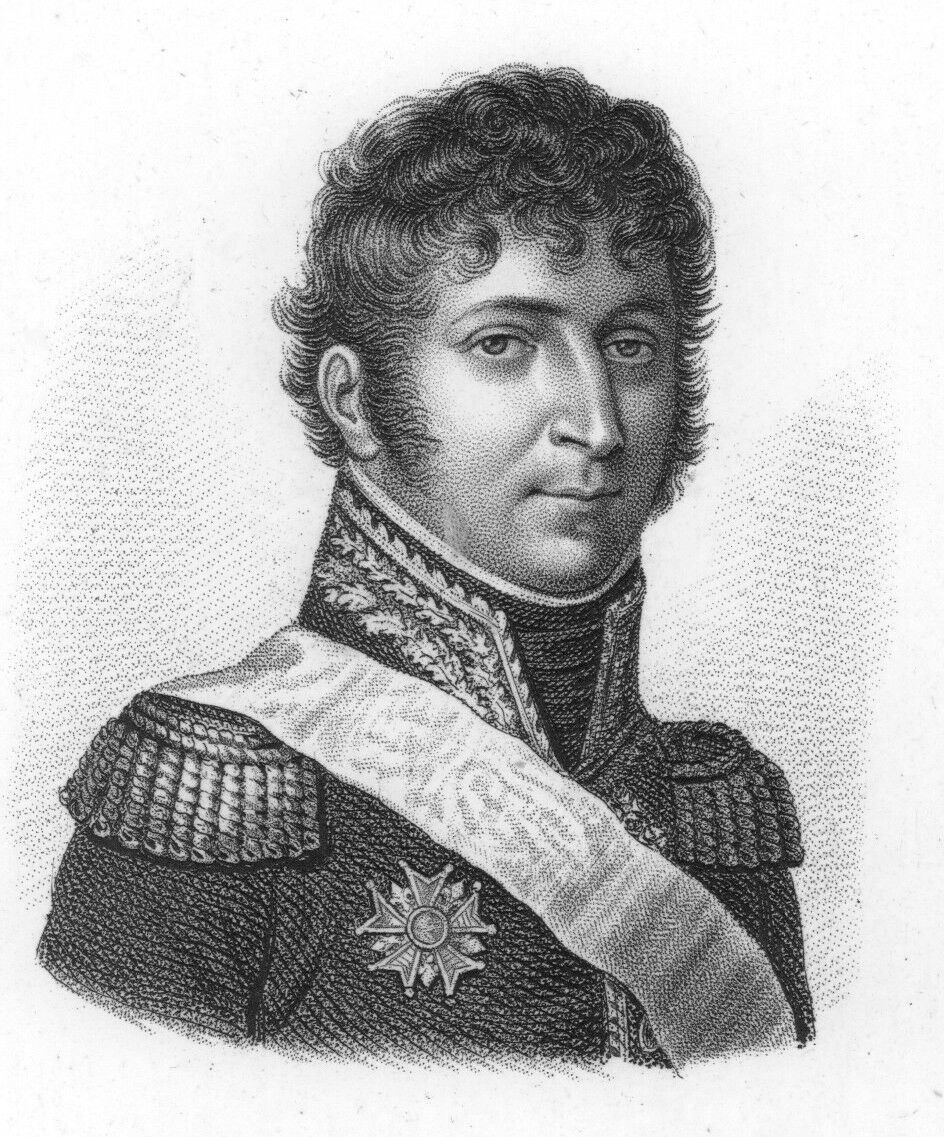
- General of Division Olivier Macoux Rivaud de la Raffinière
- Born: 10 February 1766; Civray, Vienne, France
- Died: 19 December 1839 (aged 73); Angoulême, France
- Military career
- Allegiance: (France) French First Republic, (France) First French Empire
- Branch: Infantry
- Rank: General of Division
- Conflicts: French Revolutionary Wars; Napoleonic Wars
- Awards: Légion d'honneur (Grand Cross); Order of Saint Louis (Commander); Name inscribed under the Arc de Triomphe, Baron of the Empire

Olivier Macoux Rivaud, Baron de la Raffinière (French pronunciation: [ɔlivje maku ʁivo də la ʁafinjɛʁ]; 10 February 1766, in Civray, Vienne – 19 December 1839, in Angoulême) was a French infantry commander during the French Revolutionary and Napoleonic Wars.

== Military service ==
- 14 June 1800: Commanded a brigade in Chambarlhac's Division at the Battle of Marengo
- 3 December 1805: Commanded an infantry division in the I Corps at the Battle of Austerlitz
- 17 October 1806: Commanded the 2nd Division of the I Corps at the Battle of Halle
- 6 November 1806: Commanded the 2nd Division of the I Corps at the Battle of Lübeck
