= Johann von Hinrichs =

German officer (1752–1834)

- Born: 1752
- Died: 1834 (aged 81–82)
- Allegiance: Hesse-Kassel; Kingdom of Prussia
- Branch: Engineers, Infantry
- Service years: 1776–1806 (?)
- Rank: Generalleutnant
- Conflicts: American Revolutionary War; Napoleonic Wars
- Other work: Proprietor, Fusilier Battalion Nr. 17

Johann von Hinrichs (1752–1834) received training as a military engineer. He served as an officer of Hessian jägers during the American Revolutionary War. He wrote a series of letters to his Minister of War which survive as an important historical record. Some time after the war, he offered his sword to the Kingdom of Prussia. In 1806 he commanded a brigade in the Prussian army and was captured in one of the early battles.

== American Revolution ==
Hinrichs was born in 1752 and joined the army of Hesse-Kassel. He fought in the American Revolutionary War as part of the first group of Hessian soldiers to arrive in America starting in 1776. While serving as a lieutenant of jägers, he was badly wounded in the chest during the New York and New Jersey Campaign. He was promoted to captain in 1778 and wounded "several" more times during the war. He penned a series of letters to Friedrich Christian Arnold von Jungkenn, the Hesse-Kassel Minister of State. These missives survived and provide an important account of the war. On 18 January 1778 he wrote that the Americans were not, "to be despised", and that it only, "requires Time and good leadership to make them formidable". He also described his activities in detail during the Siege of Charleston in 1780. Historian Mark M. Boatner III remarked that his writings show that, "he was well-educated and had a keen and intelligent interest in a wide variety of subjects from fighting to music". He was trained as an engineer, fought as a jäger officer, and entered the line infantry in 1784. Transferring his allegiance to Prussia soon after, he was granted a title of nobility.

== Napoleonic Wars ==
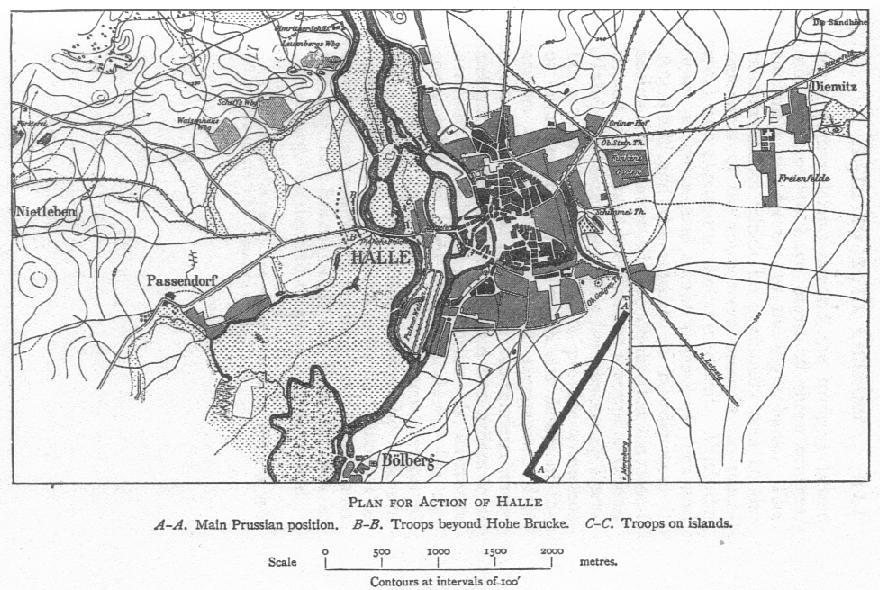
Map of the Battle of Halle on 17 October 1806

By 1806, Hinrichs was a General-major in command of a brigade in Eugene Frederick Henry, Duke of Württemberg's Prussian Reserve in the War of the Fourth Coalition. On 17 October 1806, he fought in the Battle of Halle against the French I Corps under France Jean-Baptiste Bernadotte. Hinrichs' Advance Guard was made up of the Borell Fusilier battalion Nr. 9, Knorr Fusilier battalion Nr. 12, and Hinrichs Fusilier battalion Nr. 17, two squadrons of Usedom Hussar Regiment Nr. 10, one squadron of Hertzberg Dragoon Regiment Nr. 9, one squadron of Heyking Dragoon Regiment Nr. 10, and two horse artillery pieces.

Württemberg's two infantry divisions lined up facing the city of Halle on the east bank of the Saale River. Meanwhile, Hinrichs defended the bridges on the west side of the city with a screen of infantry and dragoons, plus a few artillery pieces. Pierre Dupont de l'Etang sent the 32nd Line Infantry Regiment charging east along the causeway that led to the bridges with the 9th Light Infantry and three cannons in support. The French smashed through the Prussian defenses and quickly seized an island in the river. The Prussian foot soldiers remaining on the west bank were rounded up and captured while the dragoons swam their horses to safety. Within an hour Dupont's soldiers captured all three bridges and made Hinrichs a prisoner. Rushing into Halle, the I Corps overran a Prussian battalion and routed another from the city. In the subsequent fighting, Württemberg's force was badly mauled, losing 5,000 killed, wounded, and captured. Bernadotte reported only 800 casualties.

In the War of the Sixth Coalition, Hinrichs commanded 8,400 Prussian Landwehr at the siege of Küstrin. The operation lasted from April 1813 to 7 March 1814 before 5,000 French troops under Jean-Louis Fournier d'Albe surrendered. Hinrichs led three battalions each of the 1st East Prussian, 2nd East Prussian, and 3rd Neumark Landwehr Regiments, two squadrons of the 2nd Neumark Landwehr Cavalry Regiment, and one 6-pound foot battery. Hinrichs was promoted to Generalleutnant before his death in 1834.
