= François Werlé =

François Jean Werlé (6 September 1763, Soultz-Haut-Rhin – 16 May 1811) was a Général de Brigade of the First French Empire who saw action during the Napoleonic Wars and died fighting against the British during the Peninsular War.

== Early career ==
Werlé received the rank of Chef de Brigade on 25 March 1799 and promoted to Général de Brigade on 29 August 1803. He commanded a brigade in Jean-Baptiste Drouet, Comte d'Erlon's division of Marshal Jean-Baptiste Bernadotte's I Corps at the Battle of Austerlitz. Still serving as an I Corps brigadier, he played a role in the Battle of Schleiz on 9 October 1806, clearing a forest of Prussian outposts. He participated in the pursuit of the Prussian Army after Emperor Napoleon's army defeated it at the Battle of Jena–Auerstedt. He participated in the defeat of Duke Eugen of Württemberg's corps at the Battle of Halle on 17 October. Later, he was in on the defeat and capture of Gebhard Leberecht von Blücher's column in the Battle of Lübeck on 6 November.

== Peninsular War ==
In November 1809, Werlé led a Polish division in IV Corps at the decisive French victory at the Battle of Ocaña. His 5,600-man brigade (actually the size of a division) formed the French reserve at the Battle of Albuera. He was killed in that battle when Marshal Soult sent the reserve into the battle. After a bitter firefight with Lowry Cole's British division, Werlé's French soldiers were defeated.

Aside from his military rank, Werlé became a Commander of the Légion d'Honneur on 14 June 1804, and was made a Baron of the Empire on 27 November 1808.
