= Battle of Halle =

1806 Battle during the War of the Fourth Coalition

- Part of the War of the Fourth Coalition
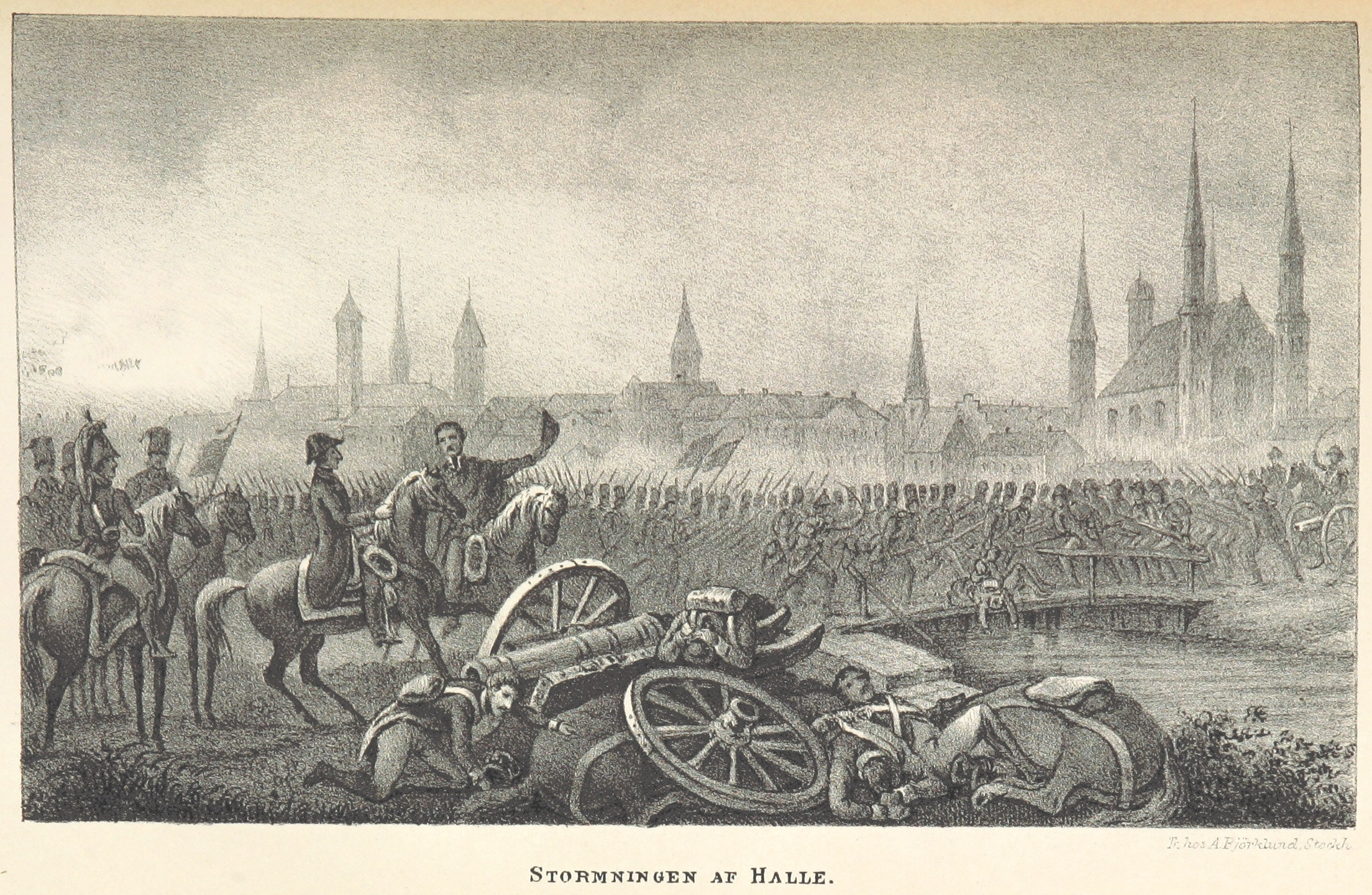
- The Battle of Halle, October 17th 1806
Date	17 October 1806
Location	Halle, Saxony-Anhalt, Germany 51.4667°N 11.9667°E
Result	French victory

Belligerents
(France) French Empire	(Kingdom of Prussia) Prussia

Commanders and leaders
(France) Jean-Baptiste Bernadotte	(Kingdom of Prussia) Duke of Württemberg

Strength
16,000–20,594; 34 guns	13,700–16,000; 58 guns

Casualties and losses
800	5,000–5,200; 11 guns 4 colours

War of the Fourth Coalition
⬤ current battle
⬤ Napoleon not in command
⬤ Napoleon in command

In the Battle of Halle on 17 October 1806, a French corps led by Jean-Baptiste Bernadotte fought the Prussian Reserve under Eugene Frederick Henry, Duke of Württemberg. The French defeated their opponents, forcing the Prussians to retreat northeast toward Dessau after suffering heavy losses. The clash occurred in the War of the Fourth Coalition, part of the Napoleonic Wars. The city of Halle is located about 30 kilometres (19 mi) northwest of Leipzig on the Saale River.

Emperor Napoleon I of France invaded the Electorate of Saxony and inflicted two disastrous defeats on the Prussian-Saxon armies at the Battle of Jena-Auerstadt. As the beaten armies fled, Marshal Bernadotte's corps marched north and found Duke Eugene's Reserve, which had not yet seen action, at Halle. At the beginning of the encounter, two French divisions rushed the bridges over the Saale on the west side of the city. They overran a weak defending force and quickly occupied the city. In one stage of the battle, Bernadotte was advancing against superior numbers along a narrow causeway, to which Napoleon stated:

"Bernadotte hesitates at nothing, one day the Gascon will get caught." (P.S.: Bernadotte was born in Pau, in the historical and cultural area of Gascony.)

Later in the day, Bernadotte's troops stormed out of Halle and attacked Eugene's Reserve which was drawn up to the southeast of the city. The Prussians were driven from their positions and chased to the northeast. While this engagement was going on, Bernadotte's third division surrounded and captured a Prussian regiment isolated on the west side of the city. One of the few intact Prussian forces west of the Elbe River was now crippled.

== Background ==
=== Political ===
Napoleon's decisive victory at the Battle of Austerlitz on 2 December 1805 profoundly affected the balance of power in Europe. After this event, Emperor Francis I of Austria sued for peace and Tsar Alexander I of Russia withdrew his crippled army from Austrian territory, ending the War of the Third Coalition. Prussia was caught at a diplomatic disadvantage since her emissary Christian Graf von Haugwitz was on the point of delivering an ultimatum to Napoleon when the war ended, a fact which the French emperor was well aware.

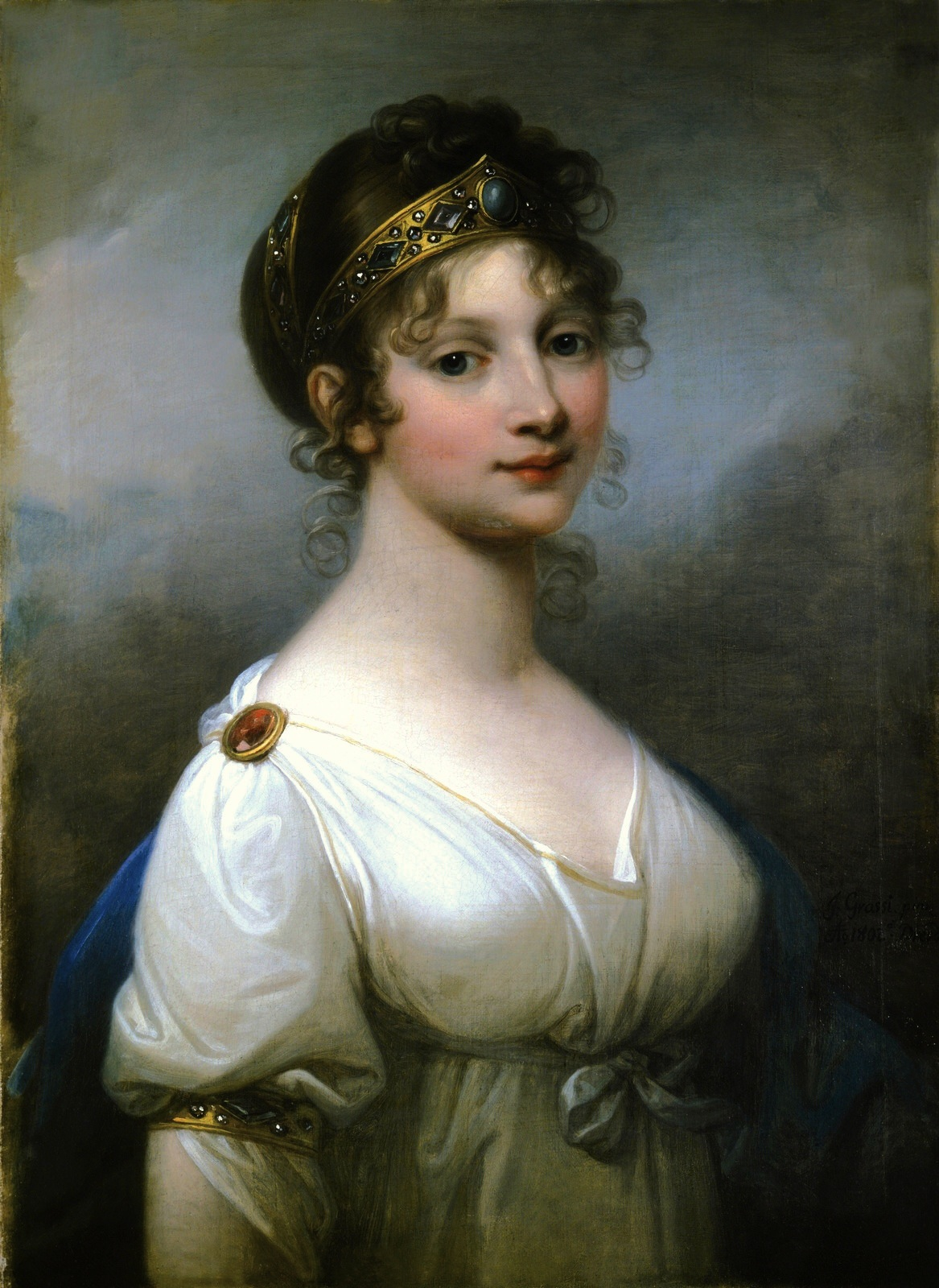
Queen Louise

In February 1806, Napoleon pressured a cowed Prussia into handing over several territories to France and her allies in return for the state of Hanover, which was under French occupation. The agreement pushed Prussia into a break with Great Britain whose king was the Hanoverian elector.

Napoleon began to remake the face of Europe. He created the Confederation of the Rhine on 25 July. He named his elder brother Joseph Bonaparte king of the newly conquered Kingdom of Naples, brother Louis Bonaparte ruler over the Kingdom of Holland, and stepson Eugène de Beauharnais viceroy of the Kingdom of Italy. Then he offered Hanover to Britain in exchange for peace, which infuriated Prussia.

The peace-minded Haugwitz was dismissed, and King Frederick William III of Prussia, goaded by his Queen, Louise of Mecklenburg-Strelitz, decided on 7 August to go to war against the First French Empire. Prussia mobilized 171,000 troops, but its army had missed the changes that had overtaken warfare in the previous decade.

=== Military ===
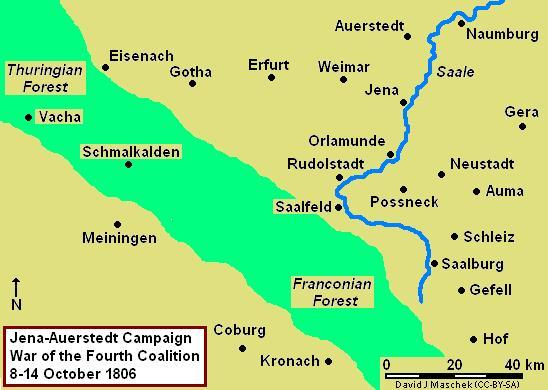
Jena-Auerstedt Campaign, 8–14 October 1806.

As the Prussians advanced into territory belonging to the Electorate of Saxony, they absorbed 20,000 Saxon soldiers into their army. The combined forces coalesced into three semi-independent armies: one under Feldmarschall Charles William Ferdinand, Duke of Brunswick; a second under General of the Infantry Frederick Louis, Prince of Hohenlohe-Ingelfingen; and a third under General Ernst von Rüchel. Brunswick took station at Erfurt in the center, while Hohenlohe deployed near Rudolstadt in the east. Rüchel held Gotha and Eisenach at the western end of the line with General Karl August, Grand Duke of Saxe-Weimar-Eisenach's division probing south toward Meiningen and the French line of communications. Eugene of Württemberg's Reserve was well to the north at Magdeburg.

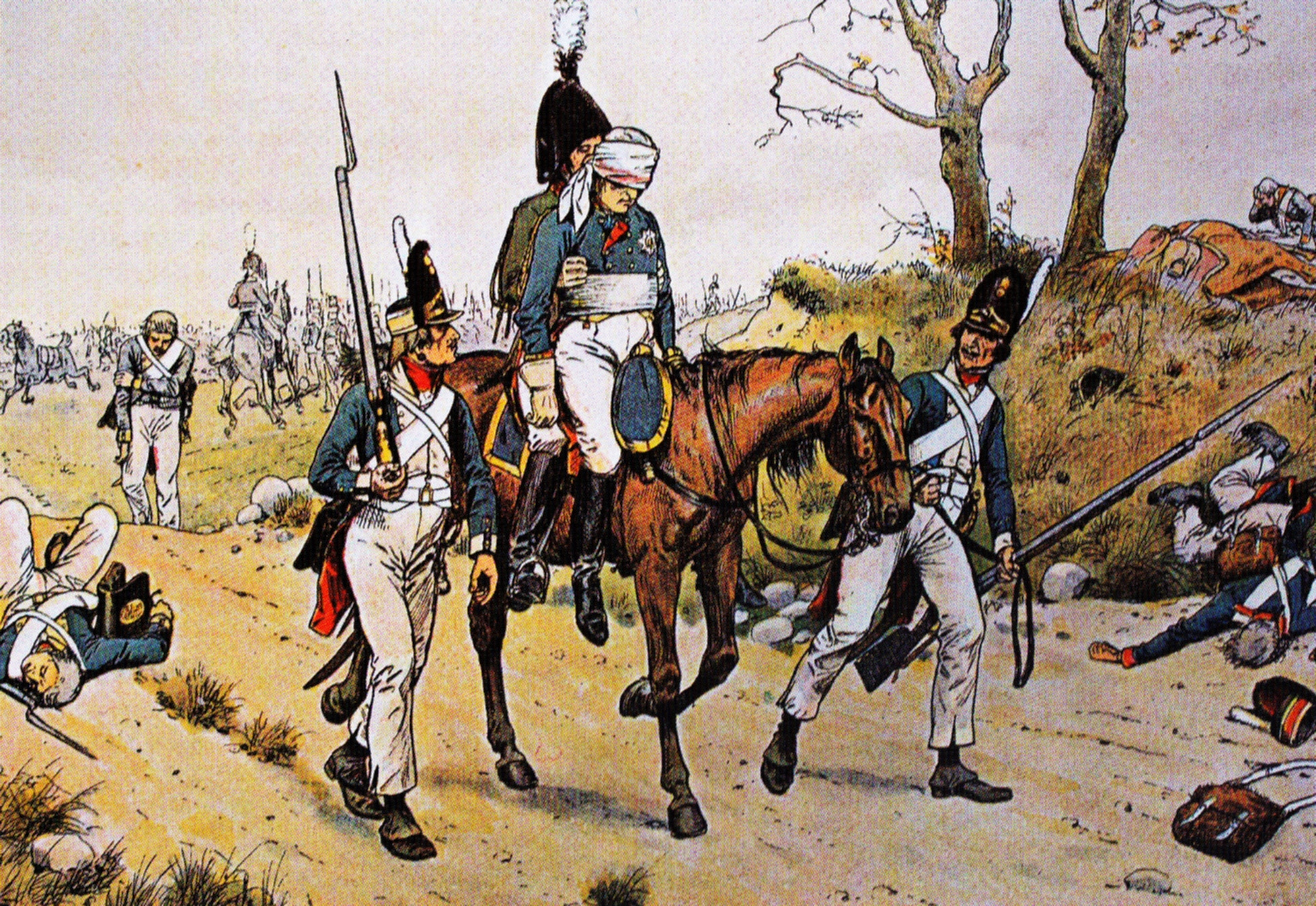
The Battle of Jena-Auerstedt shattered the Prussian armies, by Richard Knötel.

On 8 October, Napoleon launched 180,000 troops across the Saxon frontier. His troops were massed in a bataillon carré (battalion square) made up of three columns of two army corps each, plus the Imperial Guard, the Cavalry Reserve, and a Bavarian contingent. On 9 October, the leading division of Marshal Bernadotte's I Corps and Marshal Joachim Murat's cavalry forced Bogislav Friedrich Emanuel von Tauentzien's division into a withdrawal in the Battle of Schleiz. The next day, Marshal Jean Lannes' V Corps attacked the 8,300-man division of Prince Louis Ferdinand of Prussia at the Battle of Saalfeld. The young prince was killed, and his division fled after receiving a decisive defeat.

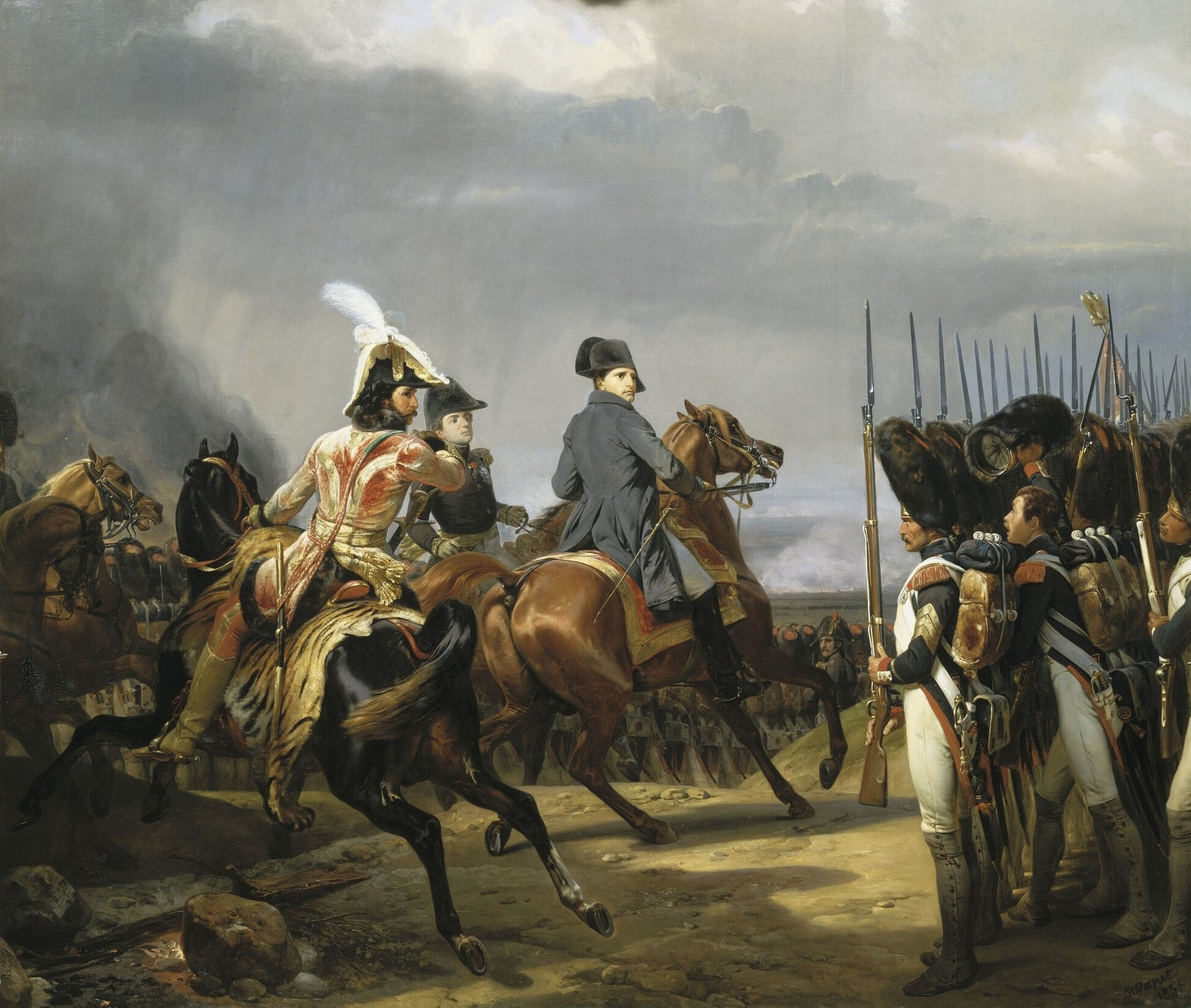
Napoleon at Jena by Vernet

Napoleon became convinced that his enemies lay near Erfurt, so he ordered his bataillon carré to make a left wheel on 12 October. The Prussian generals opted to fall back. Brunswick was to take the main army north from Weimar to Merseburg, while Hohenlohe protected the move by standing on the defensive near Jena. Rüchel's orders were to hold Weimar until Saxe-Weimar returned with his division. On 14 October, the double Battle of Jena-Auerstedt occurred as Napoleon attacked Hohenlohe while Brunswick ran head-on into the III Corps of Marshal Louis Davout. Both Prussian armies as well as Rüchel's corps were driven in rout from the two battlefields. Brunswick's army suffered 13,000 casualties and its commander was mortally wounded, while the combined forces of Hohenlohe and Rüchel lost as many as 25,000.

When Davout marched from Naumburg to glory at Auerstedt, Bernadotte and his I Corps did not accompany him, leaving III Corps to face the main Prussian force alone against two-to-one odds. Bernadotte's decision to march to Dornberg was controversial within a week of the twin battles. Bernadotte had last received positive written orders from Berthier on the day before the battle, 12 October, in which his I Corps, along with Davout's III Corps, were to lay astride the Prussians' projected line of retreat. He was the only Marshal not to receive updated, written orders on the night of 13 October. In the early hours of 14 October, Davout received a courier from Berthier in which he wrote: "If the Prince of Ponte Corvo [Bernadotte] is with you, you may both march together, but the Emperor hopes that he will be in the position which had been indicated at Dornburg." Davout thence relayed this order to Bernadotte when the next met at 0400 the same morning; this constituting Bernadotte's most recent orders.

It was not until several days after the battle that Napoleon became aware that anything was amiss. From his point of view, I Corps had been where it was supposed to be, if not arriving late. At this time criticism developed of Napoleon's dispositions in misplacing the location of the Prussians and allowing III Corps to become so dangerously isolated. On 21 October Berthier sent a message to Bernadotte accusing him of not following the order to accompany Davout. Napoleon followed suit on 23 October. Bernadotte defended himself, citing the order from Berthier on the morning of 14 October, and that he had followed Napoleon's order to march to Dornberg. A later search of the orders and dispatches from the Imperial Headquarters never yielded any order for Bernadotte to march with Davout. They did, however, confirm Bernadotte's contention that Berthier's order of 14 October made it clear that Napoleon wanted Bernadotte to march to Dornberg. The lack of documentation supporting Napoleon's accusation against Bernadotte calls into question whether Napoleon had intended I Corps to march with Davout, and the order was incorrectly transmitted to Bernadotte on the morning of 14 October, or if Napoleon was using the opportunity to shift blame for Davout having to have fought a battle on his own as suggested by Colonel Ernst Marsh Lloyd.

The emperor is said to have remarked to General of Division Anne Jean Marie René Savary, "This business is so hateful that if I send him before a court-martial it will be the equivalent of ordering him to be shot; it is better for me not to speak to him about it, but I shall take care he shall know what I think of his behavior. I believe he has enough honor to recognize that he has performed a disgraceful action regarding which I shall not bandy words with him." Napoleon took no further action against Bernadotte.

== Battle ==
=== Forces ===
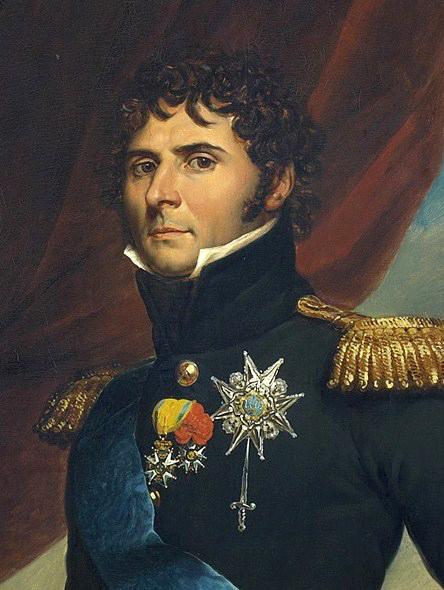
Marshal Bernadotte's failure to support a fellow marshal infuriated Napoleon.

At the beginning of the campaign, Bernadotte's I Corps consisted of 19,014 infantry, 1,580 cavalry, and 34 artillery pieces. General of Division Pierre Dupont de l'Etang led the 7,000-man 1st Division, General of Division Olivier Macoux Rivaud de la Raffinière commanded the 5,600-strong 2nd Division, Jean-Baptiste Drouet, Comte d'Erlon headed the 5,800-man 3rd Division, General of Brigade Jacques Louis François Delaistre de Tilly commanded the corps cavalry brigade, Smith gives the division numbers in his Battle of Lübeck article. Petre gives the strengths of each division on 14 October. General of Division Jean Baptiste Eblé commanded the corps artillery reserve.

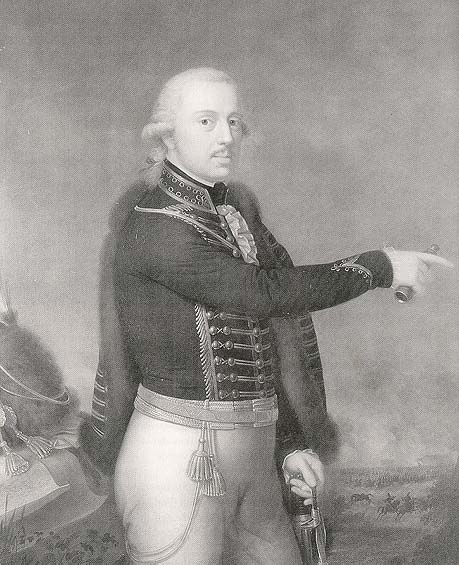
Eugene of Württemberg

The 1st Division consisted of: General of Brigade Marie François Rouyer's 9th Light Infantry Regiment, three battalions; General of Brigade François Marie Guillaume Legendre d'Harvesse's 32nd and 96th Line Infantry Regiments, two battalions each; and two foot artillery batteries of 12 guns in total.

The 2nd Division included: General of Brigade Michel Marie Pacthod's 8th Light Infantry Regiment, two battalions; General of Brigade Nicolas Joseph Maison's 45th and 54th Line Infantry Regiments, two battalions each; and one horse and one foot artillery battery, with a combined 12 guns in total. This data is from the Criwitz article.

The 3rd Division comprised: General of Brigade Bernard-Georges-François Frère's 27th Light Infantry Regiment, two battalions; General of Brigade François Werlé's 94th Line Infantry Regiment, two battalions, plus the 95th Line Infantry Regiment, three battalions; and one horse and one foot artillery battery, a total of 16 guns.

Tilly's cavalry brigade consisted of the 2nd and 4th Hussar Regiments and the 5th Chasseurs à Cheval Regiment, four squadrons each. In the artillery reserve there were one horse and one foot artillery battery of 12 total guns. In Smith's order of battle, which does not include Rivaud's division, there are six batteries with 40 guns. But his summary lists eight batteries with 36 guns. If the 12 guns with Rivaud are included, then Bernadotte's corps must have had 52 guns, many more than the 34 listed by Petre.

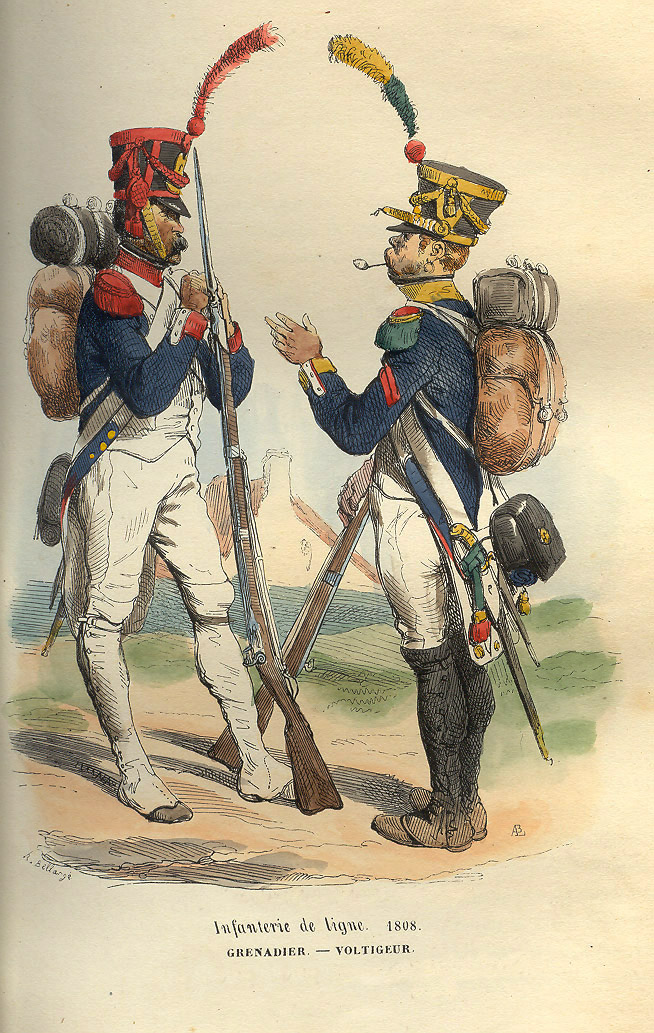
French grenadier (left) and voltigeur (right) in 1808

Before 1806, a French infantry battalion was made up of nine companies. In September 1806, Napoleon decreed that each infantry regiment must have three battalions of eight companies each, including one of grenadiers and one of voltigeurs or skirmishers. Each foot artillery battery normally numbered six cannons and two howitzers, while each horse artillery battery counted four cannons and two howitzers. The French utilized 4-pounder, 6-pounder, 8-pounder, and 12-pounder cannons, plus captured Austrian pieces. The 12-pounders were generally employed by the corps artillery reserve.

Eugene of Württemberg's Prussian Reserve included two infantry divisions, an advance guard, and a cavalry reserve.

General-Major Hans Christoph von Natzmer's 1st Division comprised the Natzmer Infantry Regiment Nr. 54, Kauffberg Infantry Regiment Nr. 51, and Treskow Infantry Regiment Nr. 17, each of two battalions, the Schmeling and Crety Grenadier battalions, and one and a half foot artillery batteries of 12 guns.

General-Major Balthasar Wilhelm Christoph von Jung-Larisch's 2nd Division consisted of the Jung-Larisch Infantry Regiment Nr. 53, Kalkreuth Infantry Regiment Nr. 4, and Manstein Infantry Regiment Nr. 55, each of two battalions, the Vieregg Grenadier battalion, as well as one and a half foot artillery batteries of 12 guns.

General-Major Johann von Hinrichs' Advance Guard included infantry comprising the Borell Fusilier battalion Nr. 9, Knorr Fusilier battalion Nr. 12, and Hinrichs Fusilier battalion Nr. 17, as well as cavalry consisting of two squadrons of Usedom Hussar Regiment Nr. 10, one squadron of Hertzberg Dragoon Regiment Nr. 9, one squadron of Heyking Dragoon Regiment Nr. 10, along with two horse artillery pieces. The reserve cavalry comprised eight squadrons of Usedom Hussar Regiment Nr. 10, four squadrons of Hertzberg Dragoon Regiment Nr. 9, four squadrons of Heyking Dragoon Regiment Nr. 10, and one horse artillery battery of six guns.

In total there were 18 battalions, 20 squadrons and 32 guns present on the Prussian side. The battalion artillery pieces of the infantry regiments are not counted among the 32 guns, so the Prussians had more cannons.

In 1806, Prussian heavy cavalry regiments were made up of five squadrons, while light cavalry regiments usually consisted of 10 squadrons. Foot artillery batteries included six 12-pounder cannons and two 10-pounder howitzers, while horse artillery batteries had six 6-pounder cannons and two 7-pounder howitzers. An infantry regiment comprised three line battalions. Each line battalion had five 174-man companies, while each fusilier battalion had four 165-man companies. Each line battalion was assigned a 6-pounder cannon and four gunners to work the piece. The fusilier battalions did not go to war with their regimental cannons in 1806.

=== Action ===
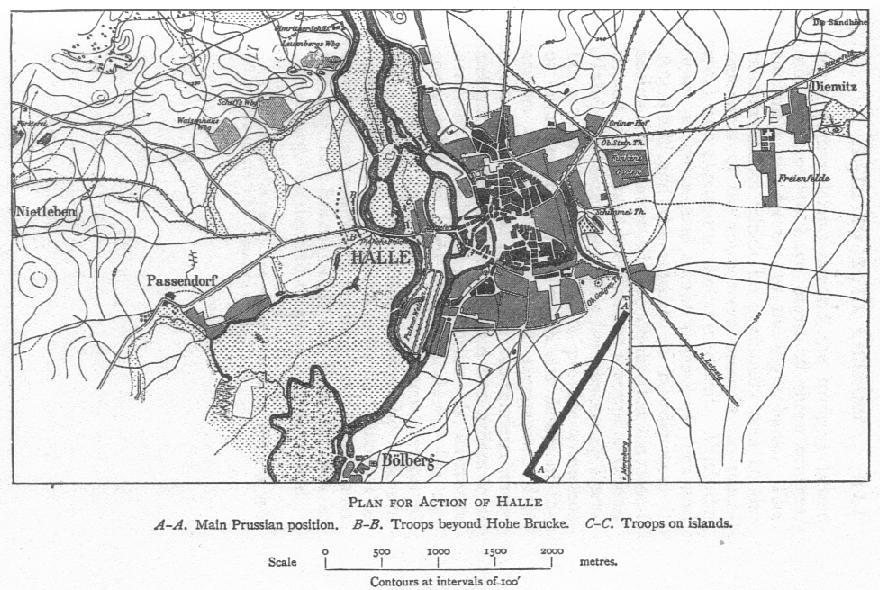
Action of Halle map by Francis Loraine Petre, 1907

At the close of the Jena-Auerstedt battle, Bernadotte had the divisions of Drouet and Rivaud near Apolda, while Dupont's division and the corps artillery remained at Dornburg. On the morning of 15 October, Napoleon instructed Bernadotte to march to Bad Bibra, Querfurt, and Halle, which would take Bernadotte's corps north and the north-east of Jena. By the morning of the 16th Bernadotte's advance guard was about five kilometers north of Bad Bibra. He heard that the Prussian Reserve lay at Halle and planned to attack it.

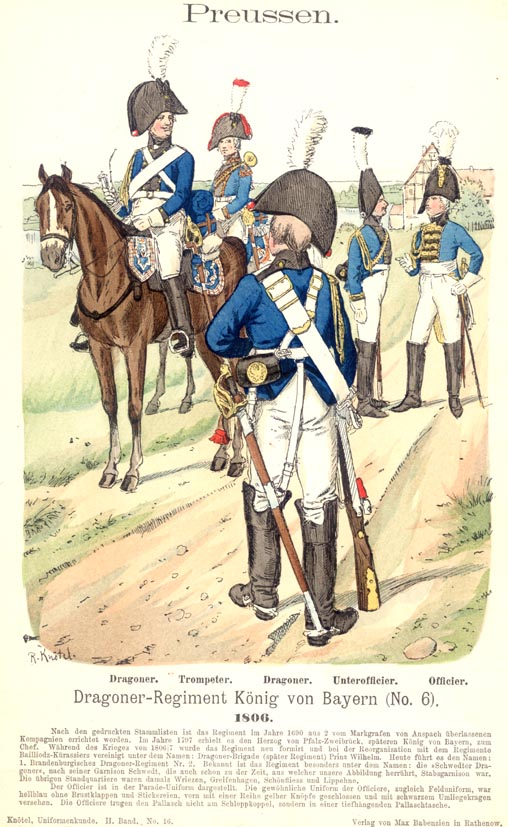
Prussian Dragoons, 1806

At the beginning of the campaign, Eugene of Württemberg mustered 16,000 troops in the Reserve. On 10 October, as he was marching to Magdeburg, he received orders to proceed to Halle. On the 13th, the Reserve was at Halle, with a battalion at Merseburg to the south and another detachment at Leipzig to the southeast. The Treskow Infantry Regiment was to the northwest at Aschersleben, en route from Magdeburg.

On the 14th, Eugene received an order to remain at Halle and that the main army was falling back in his direction. That day he heard the cannonade from the Jena-Auerstedt battles. It was not until the evening of the 15th that he heard about the military disaster. On the 16th, Eugene had received no further orders. He instructed the detachment at Merseburg, which had been reinforced to two and a half battalions, to pull back to Halle.

The Leipzig force was also recalled, while he sent back a detachment to hold Dessau on the Elbe River, a position covering the direct line of advance of any force moving from Halle to Berlin. He deployed his main force on high ground on Halle's south side, with his battle line facing northwest toward the city and his left bent back. The two and a half battalions from Merseburg were left to defend the bridges on the east side of Halle, together with a dragoon regiment. The Usedom Hussars were nearby, at the junction of the Saale and the White Elster Rivers, just south of Halle. The Treskow Regiment was at Eisleben, to the west-northwest of Halle.

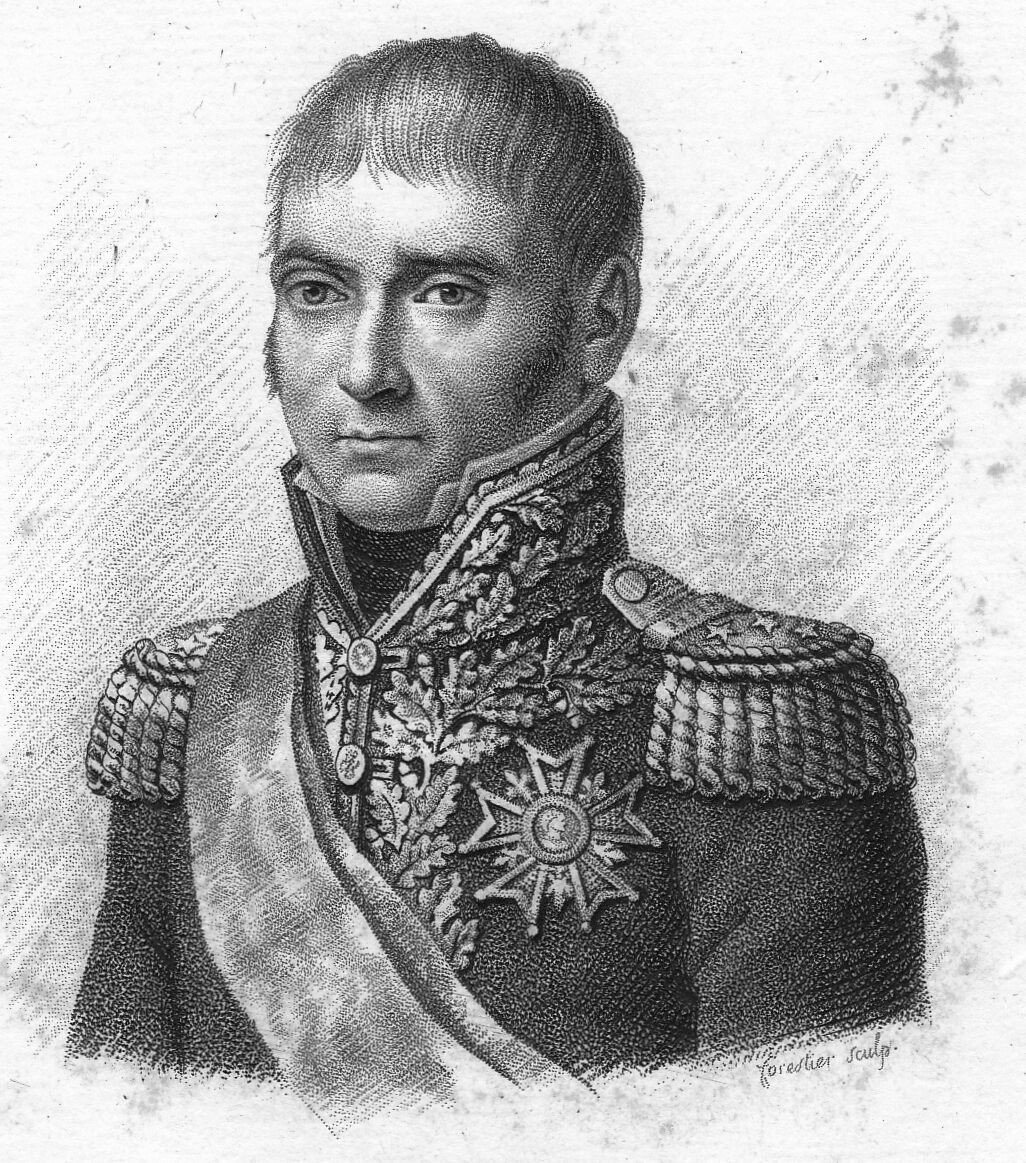
Pierre Dupont de l'Etang

Before dawn on the 17th, Bernadotte's corps set out from Querfurt to the west-southwest of Halle. Before long, he received intelligence that a Prussian column was approaching from Eisleben. He left Drouet's division to observe the Eisleben column and hurried on toward Halle with Dupont and Rivaud's divisions. On the west side of Halle, the Saale divides into three branches. In 1806, the road from Querfurt and Eisleben crossed these branches via a series of covered bridges, called the Hohe Brücke. On the west bank, to the north of the highway, stretched the Dolau wood. From Halle, which is entirely on the east bank, radiated roads to Magdeburg in the north, to Dessau and Wittenberg in the northeast, to Leipzig in the southeast, and to Merseburg in the south. The city gate to the northeast was named the Steinthor and the gate to the southeast was called the Galgenthor.

On 17 October, Eugene of Württemberg counted 11,350 infantry, 1,675 cavalry, and 58 guns at Halle, not including the Treskow Regiment. Not counting Drouet's division, Bernadotte's force that morning numbered 12,190 infantry, 1,000 cavalry, and 12 guns. Beginning at 8:00 AM, Bernadotte's advance guard pressed back the dragoon regiment from Passendorf on the west bank. In response, Eugene sent four infantry companies and two guns to support the dragoons. Five more companies with four cannons defended the first island in the Saale. About this time, Eugene belatedly started his wagon train back toward Dessau. Fearing that the French were at hand, the teamsters panicked and fled up the road, abandoning many wagons.

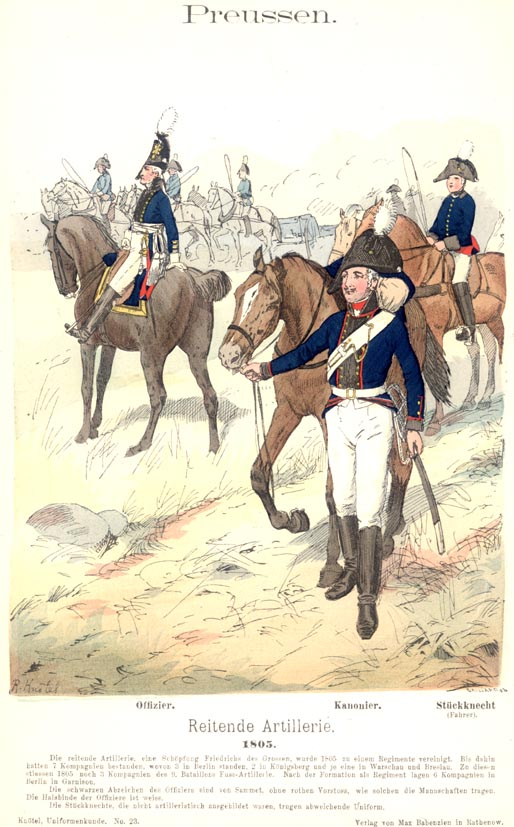
Prussian Horse Artillery, 1805

Bernadotte determined to attack at 10:00 AM. Holding back his cavalry and the 96th Line, he sent Dupont's 32nd Line charging for the bridges, with one battalion of the 9th Light and three guns in support. Racing along the embanked road in columns and flanked by skirmishers, the French punched through the defenders to seize the first bridge and the island. The Prussians foot soldiers on either side of the road were cut off from the bridge and became prisoners. Those dragoons who did not pull back in time were forced to swim across the river. In less than an hour, Dupont's troops captured all three bridges and General von Hinrichs. They burst into the town, overwhelmed a Prussian battalion in the marketplace, and chased a second battalion out the Steinthor. Rapidly, Halle was occupied along with both the Galgenthor and Steinthor. Here the French paused to wait for the rest of Bernadotte's corps to appear.

Deployed southeast of Halle, Eugene found himself in an awkward position with his line of retreat to the north stretching past the east side of Halle. He quickly shifted two battalions northward to face the Steinthor and prevent the French from cutting him off from Dessau. Reinforced by the remainder of Dupont's division, the French improvised defenses at the Steinthor and Galgenthor and in the gardens along the edge of Halle. When Rivaud's division began to arrive, led by the 8th Line, it was fed into the line near the Galgenthor. This allowed Dupont to mass his division, together with a hussar regiment, to the north near the Steinthor. The French skirmishers moved forward and subjected the Prussians to severe harassing fire.

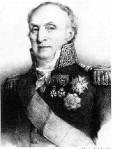
Jean Drouet

At length, the French surged forth from Halle and attacked the Prussian line. In between the town gates, the defenders swept the ground with intense artillery fire. But at the Steinthor and Galgenthor, the attackers rapidly gained the upper hand and pushed back the Prussians. The Prussian cavalry, which deployed east of the Funckengarten, near the Steinthor, was flanked and fell back toward Mötzlich to the northeast. Eugene's formation split in two, his right wing retreating toward Dessau and his left wing toward Bitterfeld. The right wing fell back in good order, pausing at Mötzlich and at Oppin where a cavalry charge discouraged further pursuit. The left wing had worse luck, being chased by Rivaud's division and most of Bernadotte's cavalry. The Prussian horsemen managed to repulse the French cavalry near Rabatz, but were driven off by Drouet's newly arrived 94th Line. The French chased the left wing as far as Bitterfeld where the Prussians managed to burn the bridge over the Mulde River.

General-Major Karl Peter von Treskow with his regiment, finding the highway blocked by Drouet's division at Nietleben, tried to reach Halle by moving to the north of the Dolau wood. As he approached the Halle bridges, Treskow's progress was checked by Maison and a few infantrymen of the 8th Line until Drouet arrived on the scene. The Prussians deployed with their left flank on the Saale and their right on a vineyard. Believing he had enough troops to deal with Treskow, Drouet sent the 94th Line and the 5th Chasseurs à Cheval to help Dupont and Rivaud. He then attacked the Prussians with the 27th Light, 95th Line, and two cannons.

Prevented from escaping through the Dolau wood by a blocking force left there by Drouet, Treskow retreated north along the west bank in two battalion squares. Near Kröllwitz, the Prussian force fell into confusion as it crossed a marshy area and lost all of its cannons. Soon after, Drouet pounced on the hapless Treskow Regiment and forced its surrender after inflicting 200 killed and wounded on it.

== Result ==
The Prussians reported 13 officers killed, 26 wounded, and 74 captured. Altogether, about 5,000 Prussian soldiers were killed, wounded, or captured. Four colors of the Treskow Regiment and 11 guns were captured, along with "many" battalion pieces. Bernadotte admitted about 800 killed and wounded.

Historian Digby Smith writes that Eugene of Württemberg "dallied far too long in Halle". Francis Loraine Petre faults Eugene's defense as "half-hearted and disjointed" and writes that his defensive position south of Halle was "badly chosen" with its line of retreat exposed. Petre suggests that too few troops defended the bridges, inviting defeat, and that the Prussians should have burned the bridges and held the east bank. Better yet, Eugene should have retreated to Magdeburg where his intact corps might have provided a rallying point for the shattered main armies. Instead, the Reserve was half-ruined by the battle.

On 18 October, Bernadotte rested his troops, who were worn out by a 28 kilometer march followed by a major battle. Eugene's survivors crossed the Elbe at Rosslau and limped into Magdeburg on the 19th.

== Notes ==
Preceded by Capitulation of Erfurt	Napoleonic Wars; Battle of Halle	Succeeded by Siege of Magdeburg (1806)
