= Capitulation of Erfurt =

1806 Capitulation during the War of the Fourth Coalition

- Part of the War of the Fourth Coalition
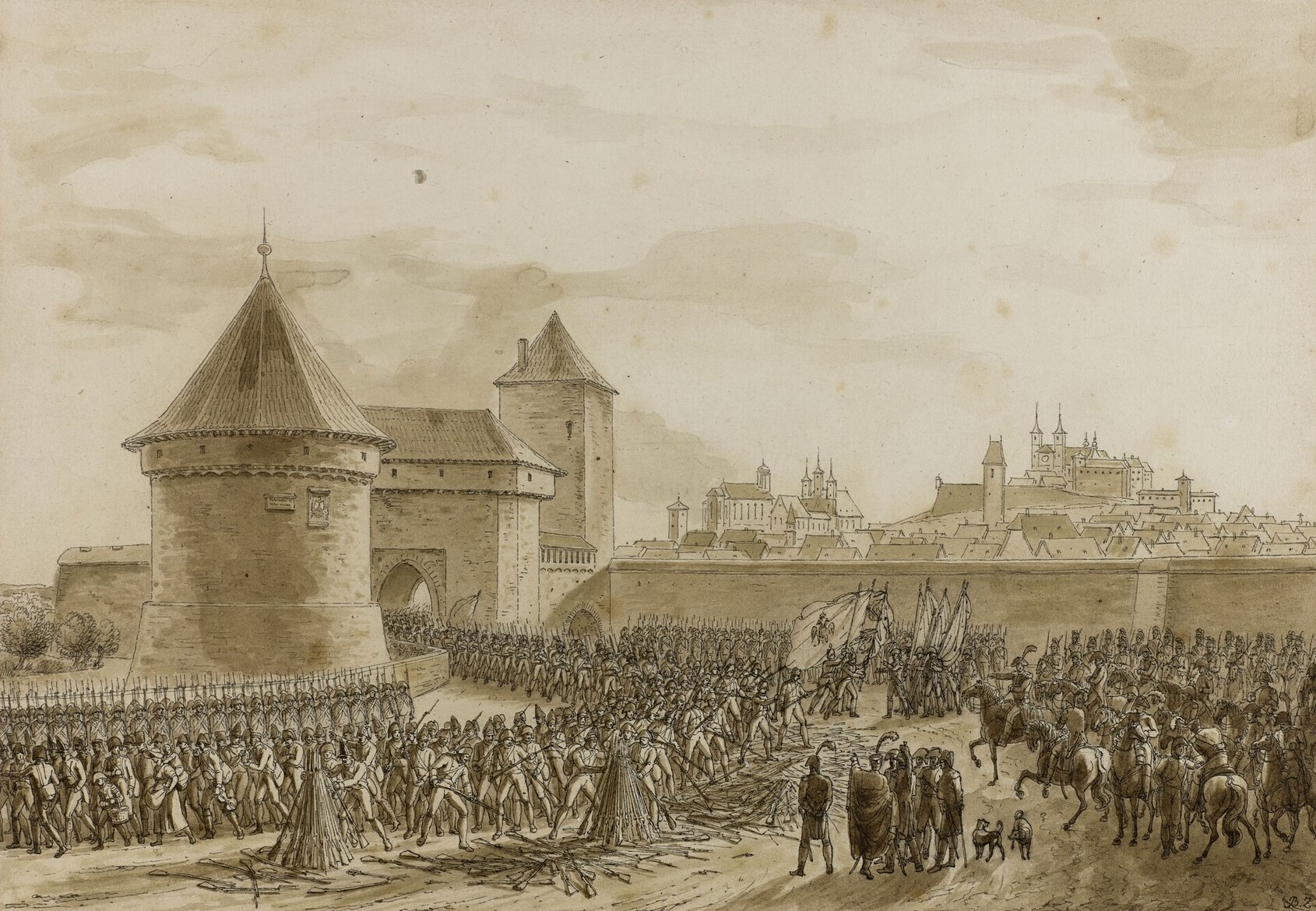
- Surrender of the Prussian troops after the capture of the city of Erfurt, 16 October 1806; Drawing by Benjamin Zix, 1806
Date	16 October 1806
Location	Erfurt, Kingdom of Prussia 50°59′0″N 11°2′0″E
Result	French victory

Belligerents
France	(Kingdom of Prussia) Prussia

Commanders and leaders
(France) Joachim Murat	(Kingdom of Prussia) Prince of Orange

Strength
16,000	10,000–12,000, 65 guns

Casualties and losses
None	10,000–12,000, 65 guns

War of the Fourth Coalition
⬤ current battle
⬤ Napoleon not in command
⬤ Napoleon in command

In the Capitulation of Erfurt on 16 October 1806, a large body of troops from the Kingdom of Prussia under Lieutenant General the Prince of Orange surrendered to Marshal Joachim Murat of France, at the city of Erfurt (now in Germany). The Prussian soldiers were demoralized by their shattering defeat at the Battle of Jena–Auerstedt on 14 October and unwilling to put up much resistance. The event occurred during the War of the Fourth Coalition, part of the Napoleonic Wars. Erfurt is located on the Gera River about 40 kilometers west of Jena.

Only eight days before, Emperor Napoleon I of France invaded the Electorate of Saxony with a large army and quickly inflicted two minor setbacks on his enemies. This was followed by the catastrophe of 14 October. In the aftermath of the battle, the organization of the Prussian army disintegrated. Large numbers of Prussian fugitives from the battle entered Erfurt and could not be induced to leave. When Murat's French cavalry arrived before the city, it was surrendered without any fighting.

== Background ==
At the beginning of October, three Prussian armies assembled in the Electorate of Saxony under Feldmarschall Charles William Ferdinand, Duke of Brunswick, General of Infantry Frederick Louis, Prince of Hohenlohe-Ingelfingen, and General of Infantry Ernst von Rüchel. Hohenlohe's army included 20,000 Saxons. In the center, Brunswick concentrated at Erfurt, Hohenlohe defended Rudolstadt in the east, and Rüchel held Gotha and Eisenach in the west. General Karl August, Grand Duke of Saxe-Weimar-Eisenach's division of Rüchel's right wing felt south toward the French line of communications. General Eugene Frederick Henry, Duke of Württemberg's Reserve lay far to the north at Magdeburg.

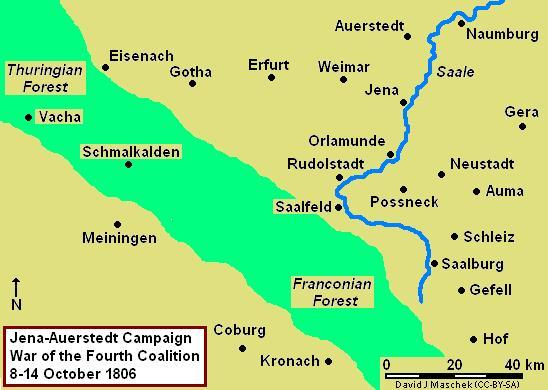
Jena-Auerstedt Campaign Map, 8–16 October 1806

On 8 October, Napoleon's 180,000 troops began crossing the Saxon border through the Franconian Forest. His troops formed in a bataillon carré (battalion square) made up of three columns of two army corps each, plus the Cavalry Reserve, Imperial Guard, and some Bavarian allies. On 9 October, the French won the minor Battle of Schleiz. The next day, Marshal Jean Lannes' V Corps crushed the division of Prince Louis Ferdinand of Prussia at the Battle of Saalfeld, killing the young prince.

On 12 October, Napoleon ordered his army to make a left wheel to the west. The Prussian generals decided to retreat, using the Saale River to protect their flank. Brunswick marched the main army north from Weimar, while Hohenlohe stood on the defensive near Jena as a flank guard. Rüchel's orders were to stay at Weimar until Saxe-Weimar returned with his division. The double Battle of Jena-Auerstedt occurred on 14 October as Napoleon attacked Hohenlohe while Brunswick ran into Marshal Louis Davout's III Corps. The troops of Brunswick, Hohenlohe, and Rüchel were driven in rout from the two battlefields. Brunswick's army lost 13,000 men and its commander was mortally wounded. Hohenlohe and Rüchel suffered as many as 25,000 casualties.

At 5:00 AM on 15 October, Napoleon began issuing orders to exploit his tremendous victory at Jena. He heard about Marshal Louis Davout's triumph at Auerstedt four hours later. Murat's Cavalry Reserve was split, with half directed to advance west to Erfurt and half northwest to Buttelstedt. Napoleon sent Marshal Michel Ney's VI Corps toward Erfurt to back up Murat's horsemen, and ordered Marshal Nicolas Soult's IV Corps to Buttelstedt. The emperor instructed Marshal Jean-Baptiste Bernadotte's untouched I Corps to march to Bad Bibra north of Auerstedt so that he could prevent the fleeing Prussians from escaping east across the Elbe River. In consideration for the troops that had done the hardest fighting on the 14th, he allowed Marshal Jean Lannes' V Corps and Marshal Pierre Augereau's VII Corps to remain near Weimar and Davout's III Corps to march a short distance to Naumburg.

== Capitulation ==
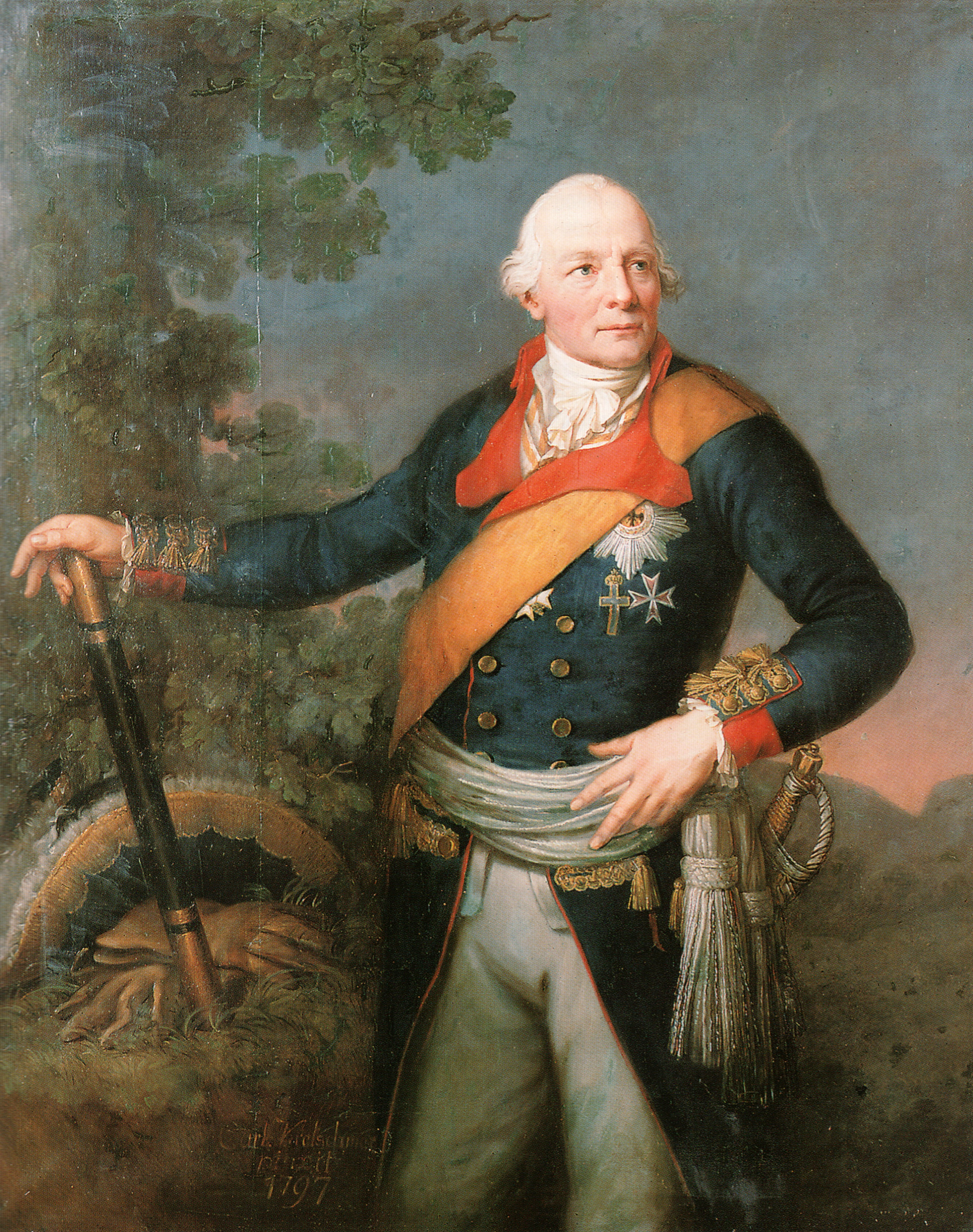
Wichard von Möllendorf

After the battles on the 14th, a large number of refugees appeared at Erfurt. At first they were refused entrance, but later the gates were opened and soon the city thronged with at least 12,000 demoralized soldiers. Attempts were made by some officers to return the troops to their regiments, but the men refused to cooperate. By noon on the 15th, Murat was near Erfurt with the leading elements of his cavalry. General-Major von Jung-Larisch stood in battle line in front of the city. His position was poor, with the Gera River at his back, so he ordered his infantry to retreat into the city. Murat's horsemen charged and drove Jung-Larisch's cavalry back across the river, capturing an artillery battery. Losses for this action are not given.

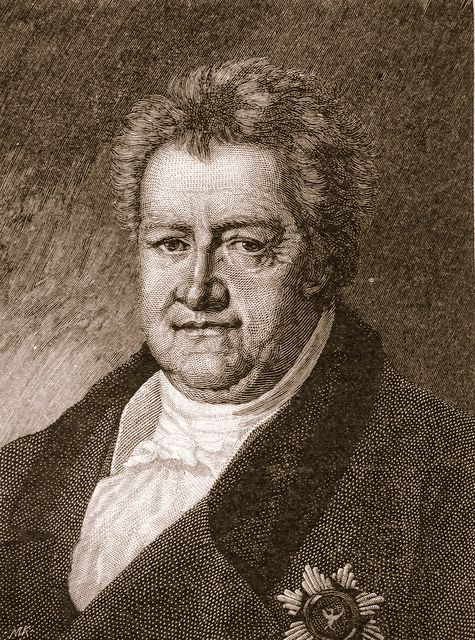
Duke Karl of Saxe-Weimar

The Duke of Saxe-Weimar's division, which missed the 14 October battle, soon appeared west of Erfurt. Feldmarschall Wichard Joachim Heinrich von Möllendorf attempted to organize an orderly retreat from Erfurt northwest to Bad Langensalza, ordering Saxe-Weimar to cover the move. The wagon train was to lead the retreat, followed by the cavalry, then the infantry. Möllendorf, who had been wounded at Auerstedt, then collapsed and proved unable to carry out the operation.

At 2:30 PM, Murat sent French Colonel Claude Antoine Hippolyte Préval into Erfurt under a flag of truce. The Frenchman demanded an immediate surrender, which the Prussian fortress commandant at first refused. Saxe-Weimar waited near Erfurt in the hope that large numbers of troops would join the retreat, but few did so. In the evening, Saxe-Weimar withdrew toward Langensalza. After joining with General Johann Friedrich Winning's detachment, he commanded 12,000 troops and 24 guns in 14 battalions, 30 squadrons, and three batteries.

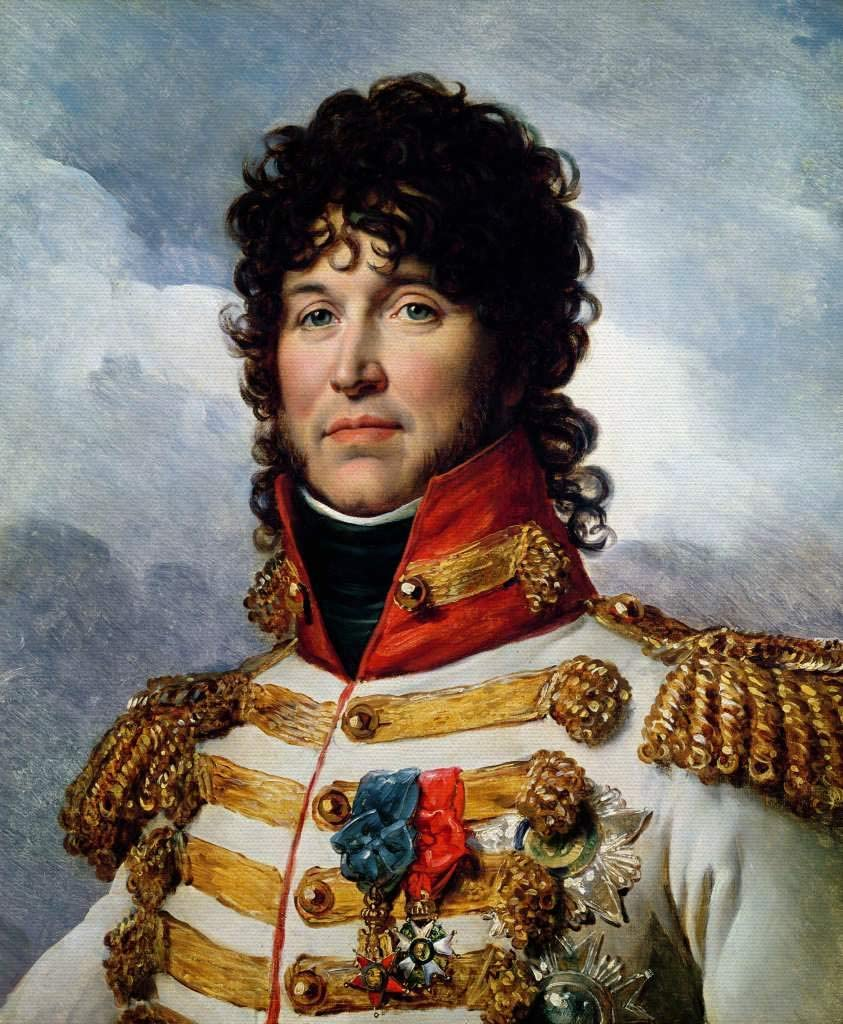
Marshal Joachim Murat

With Möllendorf out of the picture, the resolve of the fortress commandant weakened and broke. That night, he signed the articles of capitulation. Included in the terms were the surrender of the Petersberg Citadel and large quantities of gunpowder and munitions.

Altogether, about 12,000 Prussian and Saxon troops under command of the Prince of Orange became prisoners and 65 artillery pieces were captured. Colors (in parentheses) from the following units were surrendered to the victors, Infantry Regiments Grenadier Garde # 6 (2), Schenck # 9 (4), Wedel # 10 (4), Arnim # 13 (1), Brunswick # 21 (1), Winning # 23 (4), Zenge # 24 (1), Alt-Larisch # 26 (1), Hohenlohe # 32 (2), Prince Ferdinand # 34 (2), Prince Heinrich # 35 (2), Zweiffel # 45 (1), Hessen # 48 (4), and Wartensleben # 59 (2), and Dragoon Regiment Irwing # 3 (4).

Another authority states that between 9,000 and 14,000 Prussian troops fell into French hands at the surrender. The number may include up to 8,000 wounded. At the time of the capitulation, Murat had about 16,000 troops near Erfurt. The 7,000 cavalry immediately available included General of Division Étienne Marie Antoine Champion de Nansouty's 1st Cuirassier Division, General of Division Jean-Joseph Ange d'Hautpoul's 2nd Cuirassier Division, and General of Division Marc Antoine de Beaumont's 3rd Dragoon Division.

As the first batch of prisoners were being marched from Erfurt to Frankfort-on-the-Main, the column encountered 50 troopers of the Pletz Hussar Regiment # 3. The hussars scattered the inadequate escort and released between 4,000 and 5,000 prisoners. When he heard about it, an enraged Napoleon blamed Murat for the fiasco. However, Saxe-Weimar was unable to exploit this success. He tried to round up the released prisoners but they all ran away, and none could be returned to their units.

== Result ==
Erfurt's surrender permitted Napoleon to reroute his line of communication from Mainz on the Rhine's west bank, to Frankfort-on-the-Main, Eisenach, Gotha, and Erfurt. He abandoned the more circuitous route through Würzburg and Forchheim.

After the surrender, Murat advanced to Langensalza with his three divisions but Saxe-Weimar was able to break contact. General of Division Louis Klein's 1st Dragoon Division, General of Division Louis Michel Antoine Sahuc's 4th Dragoon Division, and General of Brigade Antoine Lasalle's light cavalry pursued the Prussians farther to the east, near Weißensee and Buttelstedt. The Battle of Halle occurred on 17 October between Bernadotte's corps and Duke Eugene of Württemberg's Reserve. In the action, the French inflicted 5,000 casualties on the Reserve.

Historian Francis Loraine Petre remarked that Erfurt was the first of a series of "pusillanimous capitulations" by Prussian fortress commanders. He wrote that Napoleon's plans might have been delayed if the city had held out for just a few days. Instead, the French emperor was able to immediately launch the entire army after his fleeing enemies.

== See also ==
- Principality of Erfurt

Preceded by Battle of Jena–Auerstedt	Napoleonic Wars; Capitulation of Erfurt	Succeeded by Battle of Halle
