= Battle of Jena–Auerstedt =

1806 battle of the War of the Fourth Coalition

- Part of the War of the Fourth Coalition
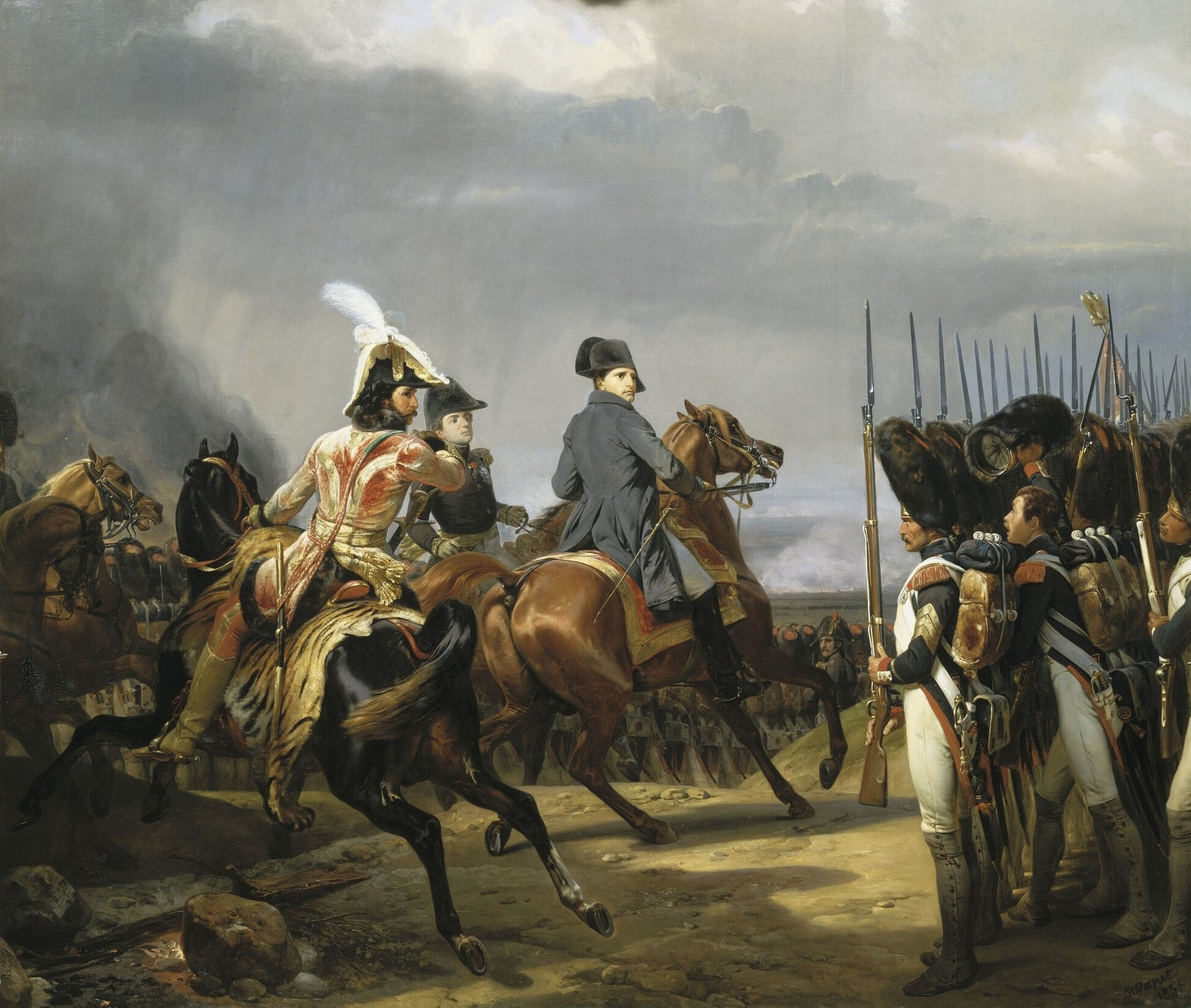
- The Battle of Jena; Horace Vernet, 1836
Date	14 October 1806
Location	Jena and Auerstedt, Germany 50°55′38″N 11°35′10″E
Result	French victory
Territorial changes	Grande Armée occupies Prussia

Belligerents
(First French Empire) French Empire	(Kingdom of Prussia) Prussia; (Electorate of Saxony) Saxony

Commanders and leaders
Jena: Napoleon I; Jean-Baptiste Bessières; François Joseph Lefebvre; Jean-de-Dieu Soult; Jean Lannes; Michel Ney; Charles-Pierre Augereau; Joachim Murat; Auerstedt: Louis-Nicolas Davout; Charles-Étienne Gudin	Jena: (Kingdom of Prussia) (Electorate of Saxony) Prince of Hohenlohe; (Kingdom of Prussia) Julius von Grawert; (Kingdom of Prussia) Bogislav Friedrich Emanuel von Tauentzien; (Kingdom of Prussia) Ernst von Rüchel (WIA); Auerstedt: (Kingdom of Prussia) Duke of Brunswick (DOW); (Kingdom of Prussia) Frederick William III of Prussia; (Kingdom of Prussia) Friedrich Wilhelm von Schmettau (DOW); (Kingdom of Prussia) Gerhard von Scharnhorst; (Kingdom of Prussia) Count of Kalckreuth; (Kingdom of Prussia) Gebhard von Blücher

Strength
40,000 deployed to do battle, 96,000 total (Jena); 26,000 (Auerstedt); Total engaged: 66,000	46,000 (Jena); 40,000 directly under Hohenlohe, with 33,000 of them engaged; 15,000 under Rüchel, with 13,000 of them engaged; 64,000 (Auerstedt); Total engaged: 110,000

Casualties and losses
5,000–6,000 (Jena); 7,052–7,100 (Auerstedt); Total: 12,600 killed, wounded, missing or captured (1,000 killed in action)	26,000–27,000 (including 7,200 Saxons) (Jena); 13,000–15,000 (Auerstedt); Total: 41,000 killed, wounded, missing or captured
- Location within Europe

War of the Fourth Coalition
⬤ current battle
⬤ Napoleon not in command
⬤ Napoleon in command

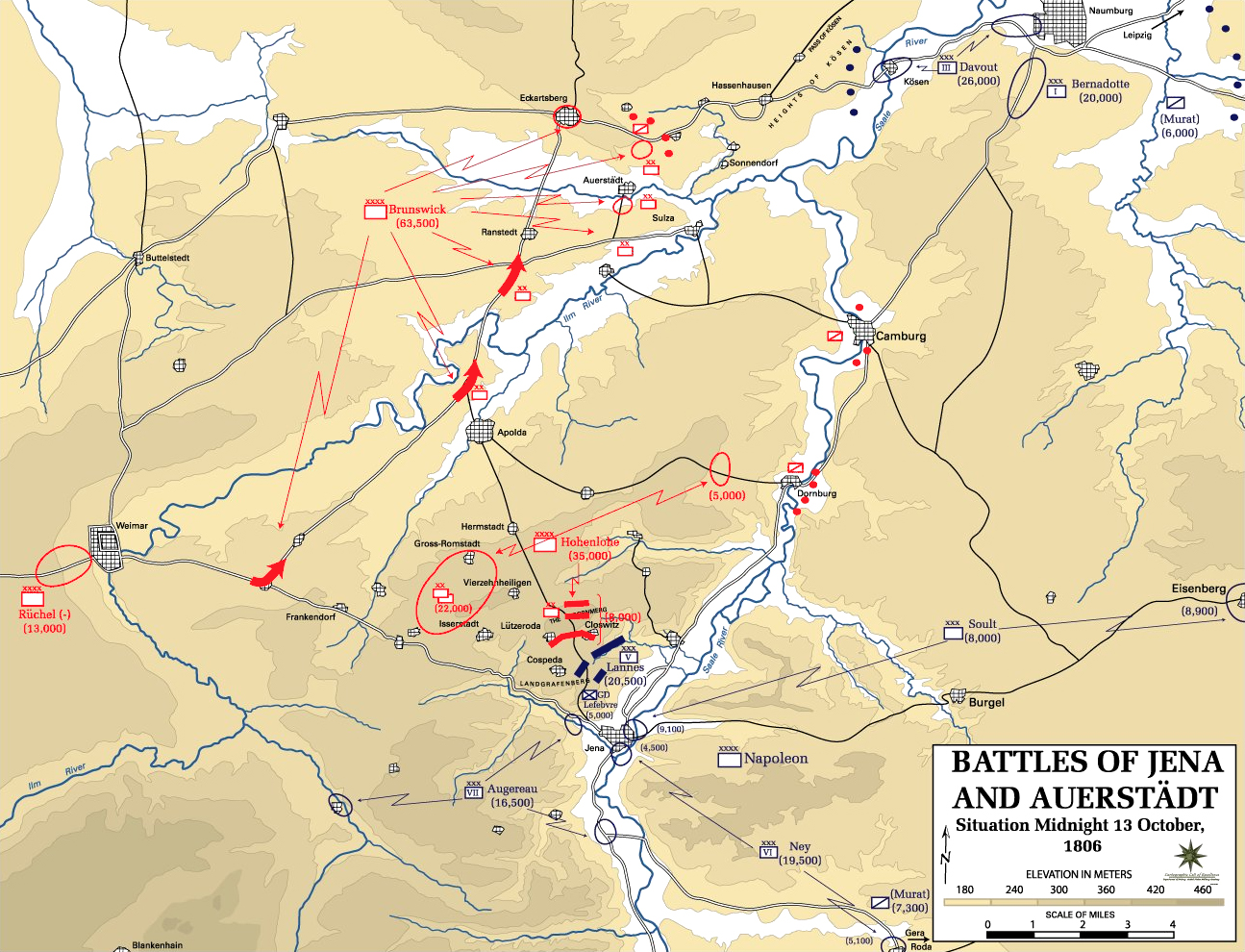
Battles of Jena and Auerstedt

The Battle of Jena–Auerstedt was fought on Tuesday 14 October 1806, near Jena and Auerstedt (then in the Duchy of Saxe-Weimar and Kingdom of Prussia, now in Thuringia and Saxony-Anhalt, Germany), being the decisive engagement of the War of the Fourth Coalition. The Grande Armée under the command of Emperor Napoleon I defeated a combined Prussian and Saxon army. One force was an imperial French force under the command of Napoleon I at Jena, while the other comprised an imperial French corps under the command of Marshal Louis-Nicolas Davout at Auerstedt. The opposing forces consisted of a Prussian army under the command of Prince Hohenlohe at Jena, and the main Prussian army under the command of Duke Charles William Ferdinand and King Frederick William III at Auerstedt.

The Prussians did not forget the military glory of Frederick the Great and venerated it, but by the time of the war, changes were needed for victory, despite the fact that Prussia showed itself well in the French Revolutionary Wars. (Note: See Flanders campaign and Rhine campaign of 1793–94) By 1806, Prussian military doctrines had been unchanged for more than 50 years—tactics were monotonous, and the wagon system was obsolete. The Prussian musket of 1806 (the 1754 model) was called "the worst in Europe" by one authority; there were many recruited non-Prussians in the royal army. At the same time, Napoleon's army was recently reorganized according to the advanced corps system, which the French Emperor improved greatly by 1805, who also had such tactics as la maraude at hand. And although the Prussian cavalry was better than the French, and the infantry was a very formidable force, this did not compensate for the shortcomings. Thus at Jena and Auerstedt the backwardness of the Prussian Army became apparent. At Jena the French were led by Napoleon himself, and at Auerstedt they were led by one of the most outstanding commanders of the Napoleonic Wars, Louis-Nicolas Davout.

The battle of Jena took the Prussian supreme commander there, Prince of Hohenlohe-Ingelfingen, by surprise due to his misorientation and ignorance of the enemy. Due to this incompetence, the Prussians fought a series of isolated, disjointed engagements, unconnected by a unified plan. From beginning to end, Hohenlohe remained disoriented regarding the enemy's strength and direction of advance, and not only did not find time to maintain control of the battle but was unable to even organize an adequate retreat; whilst Napoleon showed firm will at Jena, skillfully taking advantage of both the weather conditions (fog) and the rugged terrain (see Advantage of terrain) when his troops gradually entered the battle from the march.

At Auerstedt, Davout, at the first sign of the enemy's appearance, rapidly analysed the area, took an advantageous defensive position, and quickly brought up and deployed all his forces on the battlefield. Thus, Duke of Brunswick (overall commander-in-chief) failed to take advantage of his numerical superiority. Davout showed his steadfastness and personally rode around his position during the battle whilst proving himself a good tactician. As was stated by author Nikolai Orlov, "Davout, having concentrated all his troops, correctly assessed the Prussian position and was convinced that a bold offensive would completely disrupt them. He concentrated all his efforts on their key strategic position, Mount Eckartsberg (on their left flank), and captured it. It was the main line of operations, as it provided the road to the important points of Freyburg and Berlin. Simultaneously, he used one division to take Mount Sonnenberg (on the right), which was of merely tactical interest, and was occupied by only a battalion. Having captured these two mountains, he began an artillery bombardment of the Prussians from these mountains, which turned the simple withdrawal into a rout. The French, exhausted, hardly pursued, and stopped near Auerstedt." Davout also took advantage of the confusion among the Prussian command caused by the deaths of Brunswick and Friedrich Wilhelm von Schmettau (divisional commander).

Several figures who were later integral to the reformation of the Prussian Army participated at Jena–Auerstedt, including Gebhard von Blücher, Carl von Clausewitz, August Neidhardt von Gneisenau, Gerhard von Scharnhorst, and Hermann von Boyen.

== Background ==
Following the Prussian declaration of war, Napoleon initiated his campaign against the Fourth Coalition by thrusting a 180,000-strong force through the Franconian Forest. The Prussian army, meanwhile, awaited Napoleon's advance with a force composed of about 130,000 Prussians and 20,000 Saxons. In comparison to the modern, tightly organized structure of the Grande Armée, the Prussian command was bloated and inefficient; key roles were divided between multiple officers, creating uncertainty and disagreement in the coordination of field movements. There was also no courier system in place for messages to be transmitted quickly; if orders were changed, precious minutes would then be lost making the arrangements necessary for the changes to be distributed.

== Overview ==
The battles began when elements of Napoleon's main force encountered Hohenlohe's troops near Jena. Initially 48,000 strong, the Emperor took advantage of his carefully planned and flexible dispositions to rapidly achieve local superiority, with a force reaching 96,000 men. However, less than half fought the Prussians as only 40,000 men were sent and actually took part in the battle. The Prussians, meanwhile, were slow to grasp the situation, and slower still to react. Before Rüchel's 15,000 men could arrive from Weimar, Hohenlohe's force was routed, with 10,000 killed or wounded and 15,000 captured. Ruchel did eventually bring his troops to the battlefield. Soon after it was committed to battle and Hohenlohe rode up to take personal command of the corps, they were ridden over and sent fleeing to the rear in irretrievable rout, with Ruchel being wounded. Nevertheless, Jena was a fierce battle, with 5,000 French killed, wounded or captured; and Napoleon mistakenly believed that he had faced the main body of the Prussian army.

Further north at Auerstedt, both Davout and Bernadotte received orders to come to Napoleon's aid. Davout attempted to comply via Eckartsberga, Bernadotte via Dornburg. Davout's route south, however, was blocked by the Prussian main force of 64,000 men, including the Prussian King, the Duke of Brunswick and Field Marshals von Möllendorf and von Kalckreuth. A savage battle ensued. Although outnumbered more than two to one, Davout's superbly trained and disciplined III Corps endured repeated attacks before it eventually took the offensive and put the Prussians to flight. Though within earshot of both battles, Marshal Bernadotte controversially took no steps to come to Davout's aid, refusing to take the initiative and instead adhering to the last written set of Napoleon's orders.

== Battle of Jena ==
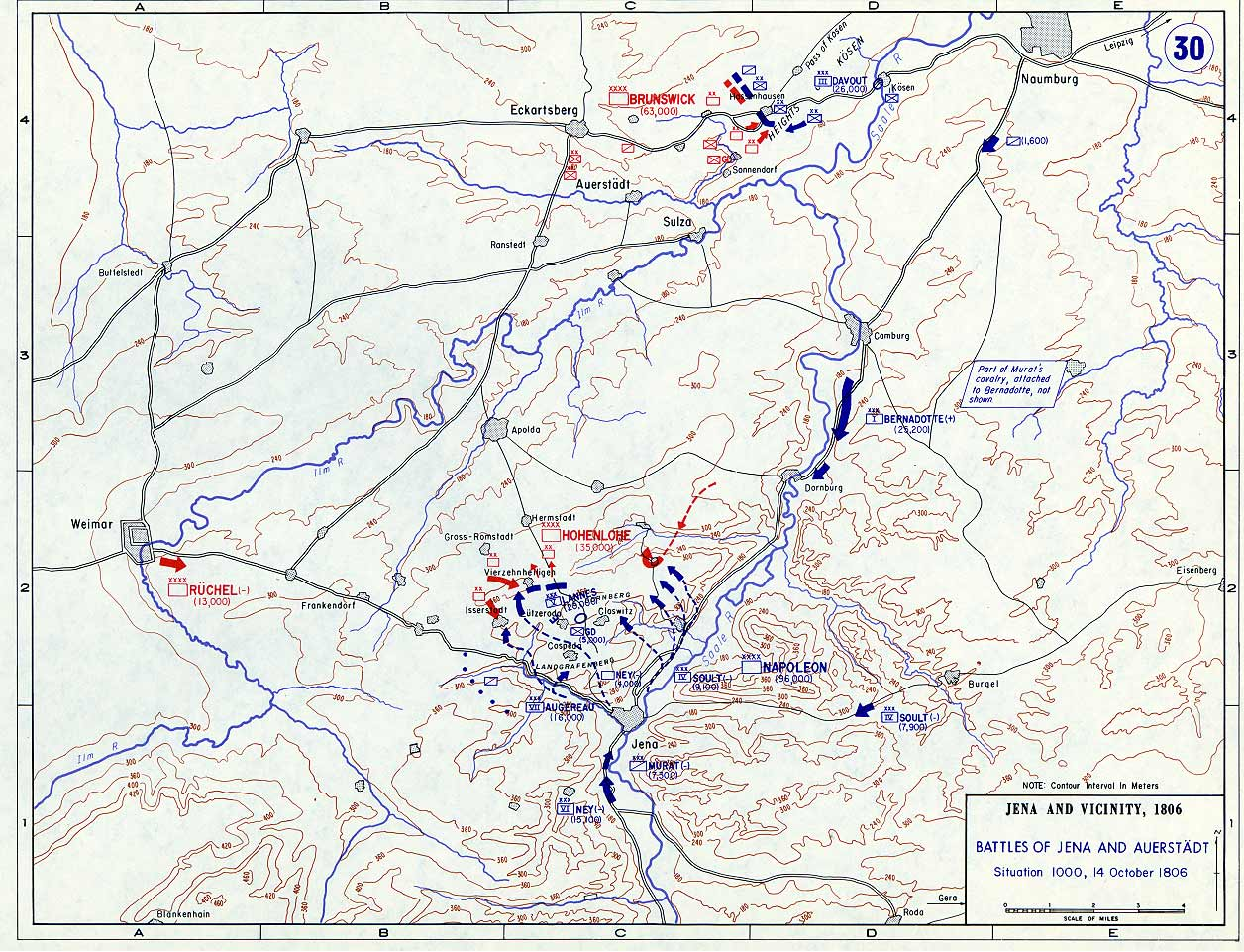
Situation – 10 a.m., 14 October

=== Plan ===
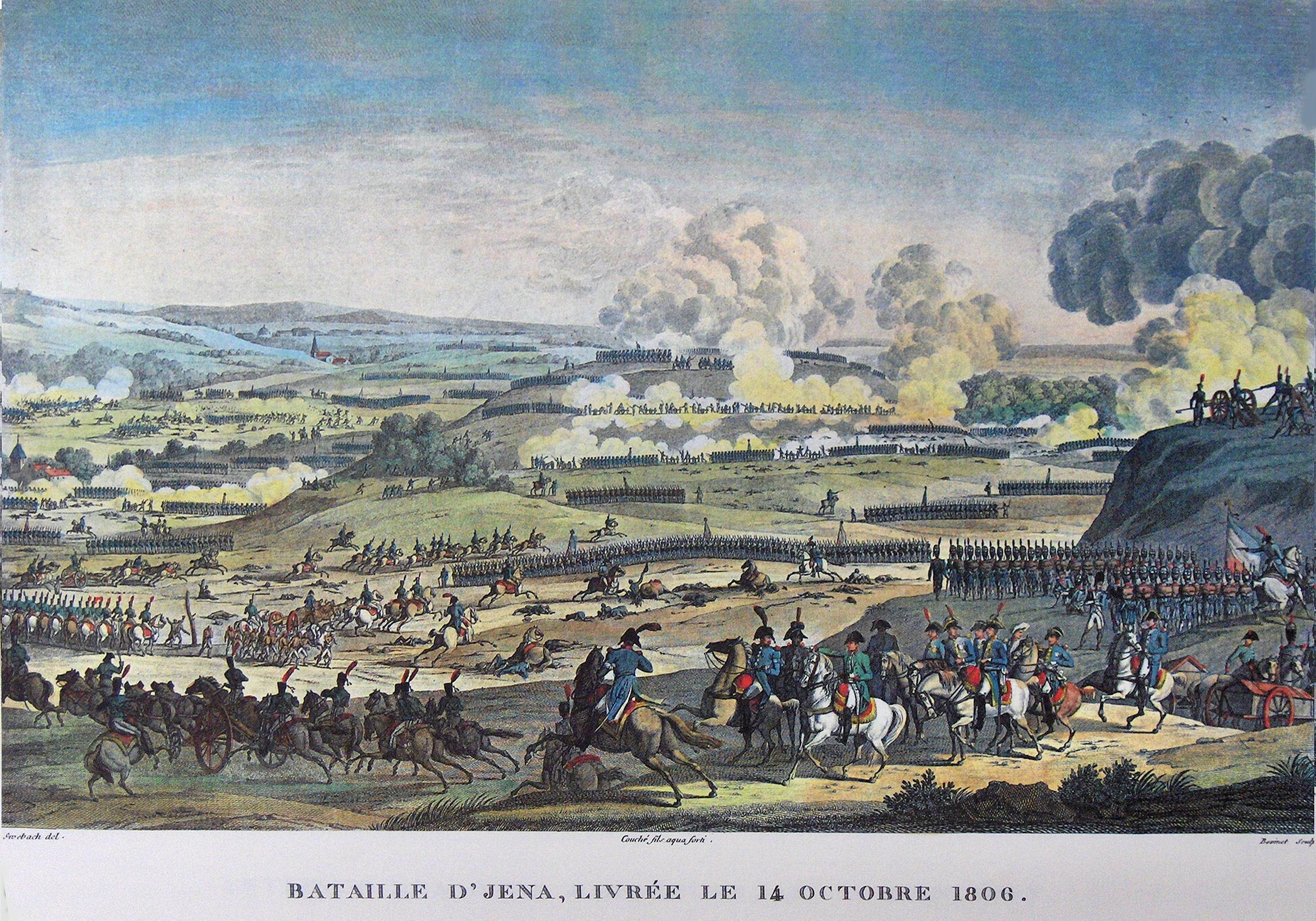
The Battle of Jena.

The Prussian army was divided into three armies drawn from across Prussia. Prussia's main weakness in 1806 was its senior command structure, which included command positions being held by multiple officers. One such example is the position of chief of staff, held by three different officers: General Phull, Colonel Gerhard von Scharnhorst and Colonel Rudolf Massenbach. The confusing system led to delays and complexities that resulted in over a month's delay before the final order of battle was prepared. Another obstacle facing the Prussians was the creation of a unified plan of battle. Five main plans emerged for discussion; however, protracted planning and deliberating shifted the initiative to the French. Thus, the Prussian plans became mere reactions to Napoleon's movements.

Although Prussia had begun its mobilization almost a month before France, Napoleon had kept a high state of readiness after the Russian refusal to accept defeat after the War of the Third Coalition. Napoleon conceived a plan to force Prussia into a decisive battle, like Austerlitz, and pre-empt the Prussian offensive. Napoleon had a major portion of his Grande Armée in position in present-day Baden-Württemberg in southwest Germany and thus decided on a northeast advance into Saxony and on to Berlin.

=== Battle ===
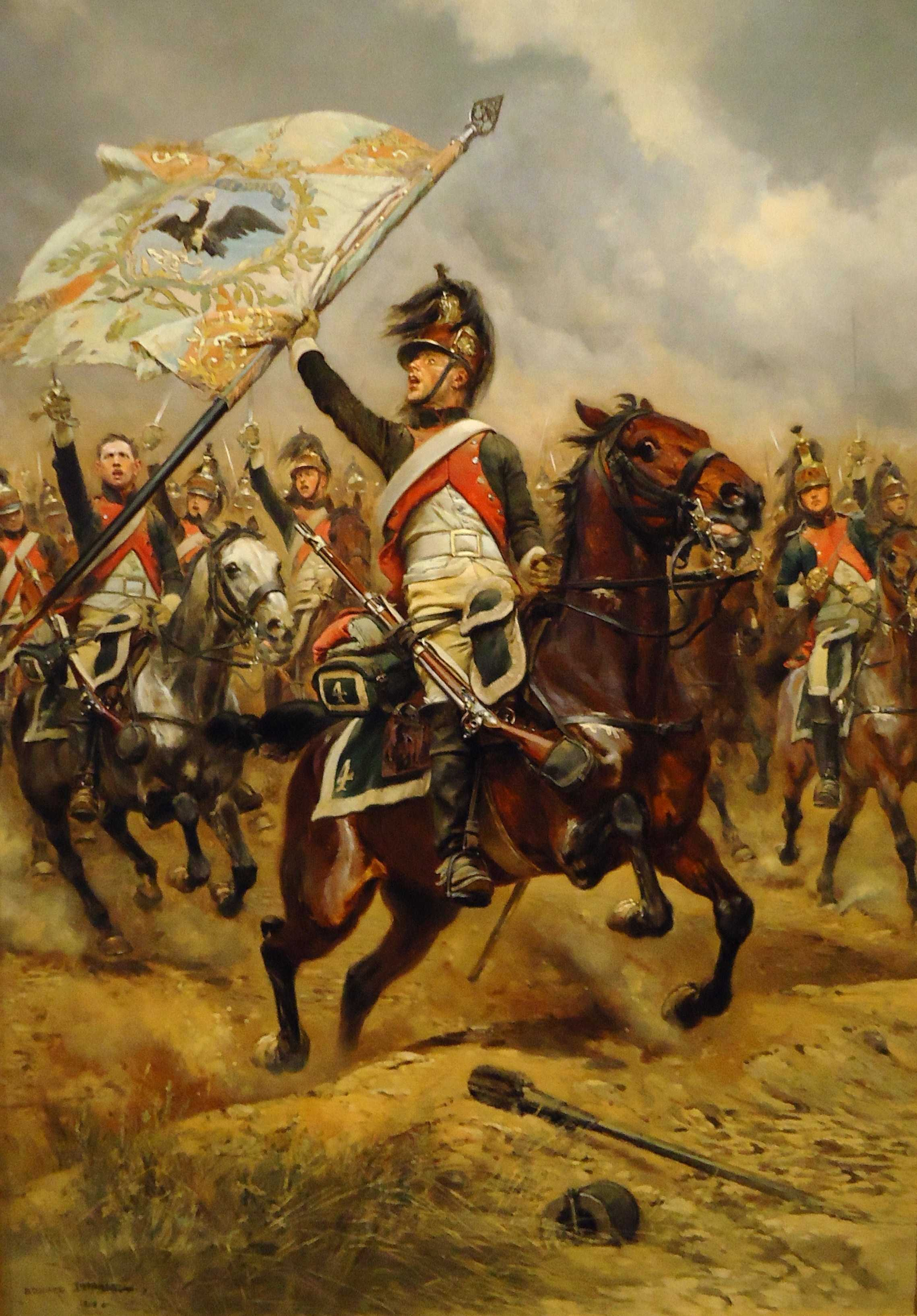
French dragoon with captured Prussian flag at the battle of Jena

The battle commenced on the morning of 14 October 1806, on the grassy fields near Jena. The first movements of the French Army were attacks on either flank of the Prussian lines. That gave the supporting armies (making up the central attack) time to get into position. The skirmishes had little decisive success, save for a breakthrough by the French General Saint-Hilaire, who attacked and isolated the Prussian left flank.

At that time, Marshal Michel Ney had completed his maneuvers and had taken up position as ordered by Napoleon. However, once in position, Ney decided to attack the Prussian line despite having no orders to do so, a move that proved to be almost disastrous. Ney's initial assault was a success, but he found himself overextended and under heavy fire from Prussian artillery. Recognizing the distressed salient, the Prussian general ordered a counterattack and enveloped Ney's forces; Ney formed them into a square to protect all their flanks. Napoleon recognized Ney's situation and ordered Marshal Jean Lannes to shift from the center of attack to help Ney.

That action left the French center weak. However, Napoleon deployed the Imperial Guard to hold the French center until Ney could be rescued. That adaptability was one of Napoleon's greatest strengths. He kept the Imperial Guard under his direct command and could order them to take positions depending on the situation that the battle presented him. The rescue worked, and Ney's units were able to retreat from the battle. Although the French were then in a troubling situation, the Prussian commanders did not take the initiative to push at the French weaknesses. That was later considered to have been their undoing. The inactivity of the Prussian infantry left them open to artillery and light infantry fire. One Prussian general later wrote that "the area around the entrance of the village was the scene of the most terrible blood-letting and slaughter".

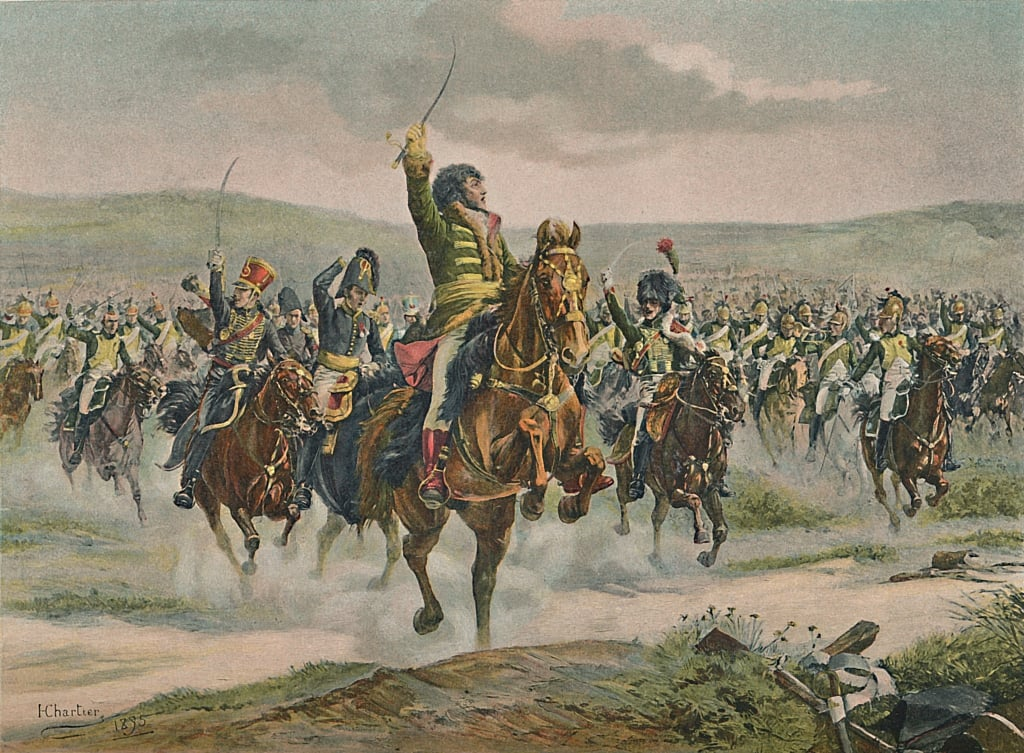
Marshal Joachim Murat, the most famous of many daring and charismatic French cavalry commanders of the era, leads a charge during the battle.

It was at that time, around 1 p.m., that Napoleon decided to make the decisive move. He ordered his flanks to push hard and try to break through the Prussian flanks and encircle the main center army while the French center attempted to crush the Prussian center. The attacks on the flanks proved to be a success. With its flanks broken, the Prussian army was forced to withdraw and Napoleon had won another battle. In total the Prussian army lost 10,000 men killed or wounded, had 15,000 prisoners of war taken as well as 150 guns.

== Battle of Auerstedt ==
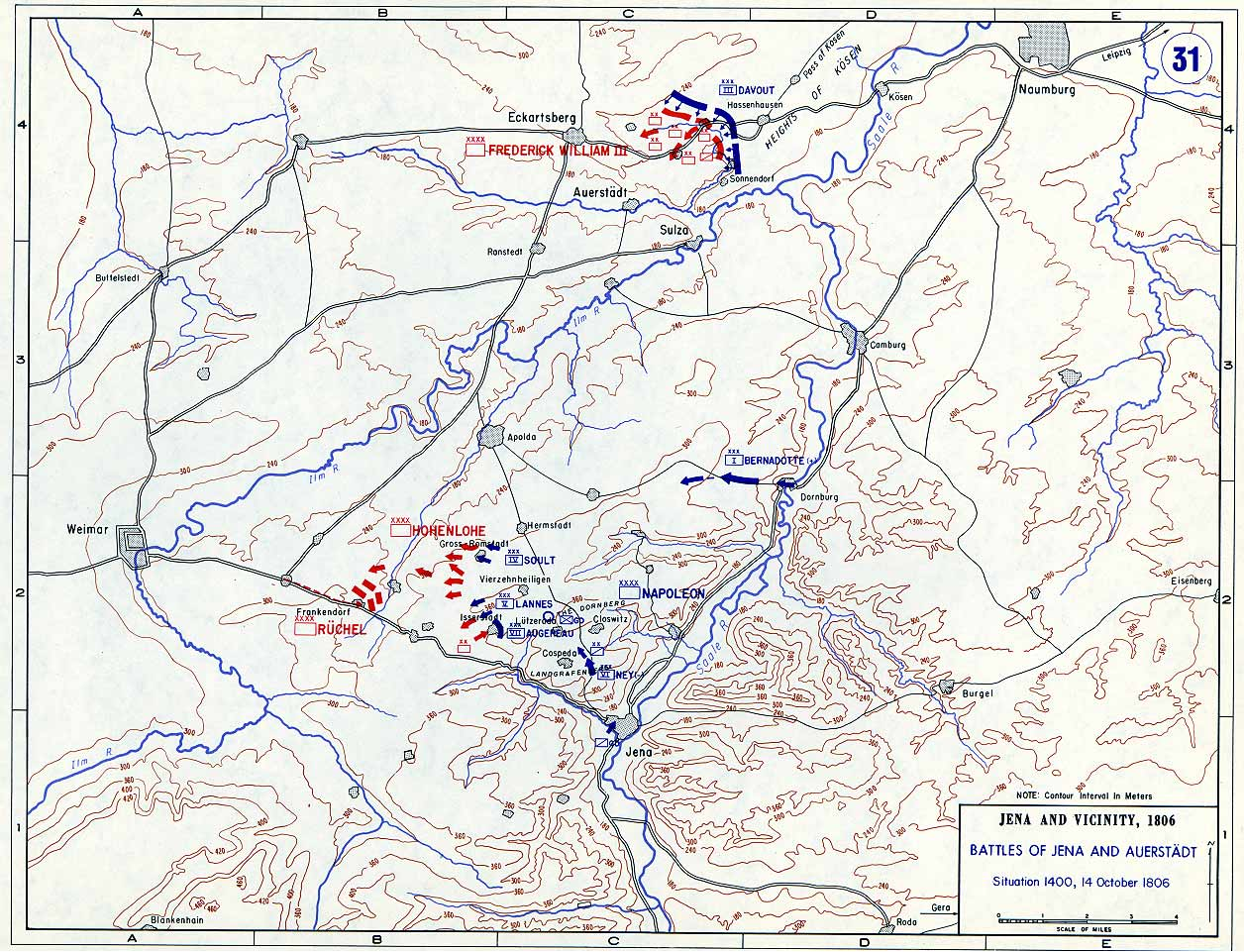
Situation – 2 p.m., 14 October

General Étienne Gudin's Division were on the move from Naumburg before 6:30 a.m. By 7 a.m. the 1st Chasseurs were stopped cold in their tracks outside of Poppel by Prussian cavalry and artillery. There was a heavy fog, which had lifted just as they approached the village. Once Davout became aware of the Prussian force, he ordered Gudin to deploy his force at Hassenhausen.

The Prussian commander on the field was Friedrich Wilhelm Carl von Schmettau. His division was actually under orders to proceed down the very road that Davout was on, to block his advance in the Kösen Pass. While Schmettau's troops were deploying to attack Hassenhausen, Blücher arrived with his cavalry and deployed on his left. Together, they attacked Gudin's troops and pushed them back to the village.

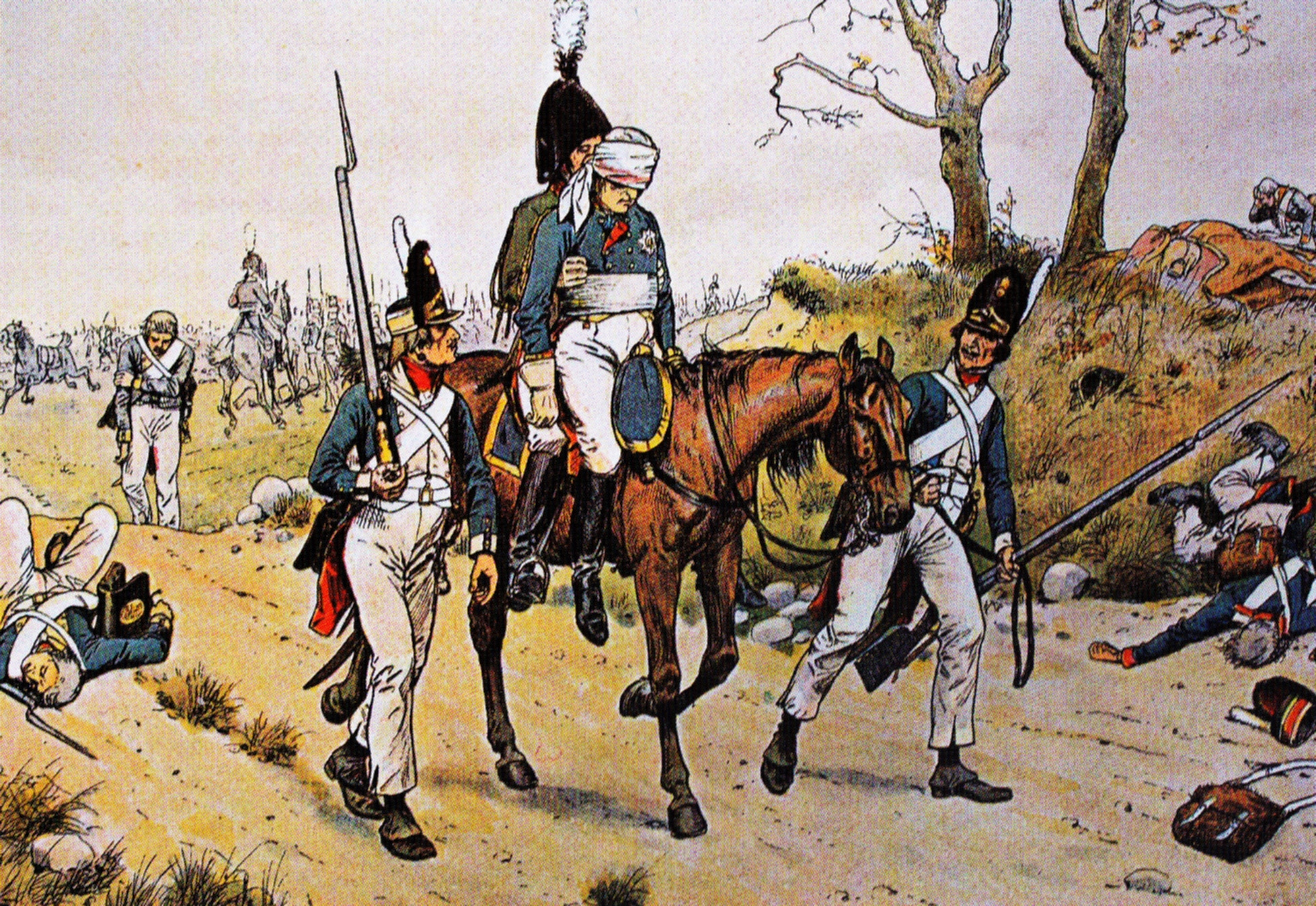
Prussian wounded and stragglers leaving the double battle by Richard Knötel. The Duke of Brunswick is the prominent figure in the painting, being wounded and having lost both of his eyes.

Wartensleben arrived at 8:30 a.m. with the Duke of Brunswick, who ordered his infantry to the left flank and his cavalry to the right. The rest of the French cavalry arrived at 9 a.m. and was placed on Gudin's left. General Louis Friant's Division and the 12-pound artillery arrived at 9:30 a.m. and moved in squares on Gudin's right. The advance of the French squares forced Blücher's cavalry back. Seeing no other option available he ordered his cavalry to attack. At that very moment, two of Wartensleben's regiments attacked Hassenhausen.

Within the battle, the French squares were rained down with grapeshot, and when Davout and Gudin encouraged the battalions, the only thing heard among the French soldiers was: serrez vos rangs, 'close ranks'. Davout also used the "reverse slope" tactic, hiding his chasseurs à cheval behind a hill and then unleashing at a crucial moment to put to flight Blücher's cavalry, which had already been battered by infantry and artillery. Everything failed: three Prussian cavalry regiments were routed and the infantry fell back. At this critical point, the Duke needed to take drastic action. Shortly before 10 a.m., he ordered a full assault on Hassenhausen. By 10 a.m., the Duke of Brunswick was carried from the field mortally wounded along with Schmettau who was also badly wounded. With the loss of both commanders, the Prussian command broke down. The Prussian army was in danger of collapse.

Oswald's infantry and the Prince of Orange, the later William I of the Netherlands, arrived about 10:30 a.m., and the King made his only decision of the day: to split Orange's command in two, half to each flank. On the French side, Morand's Division arrived and was sent to secure Gudin's left. Davout could now see that the Prussians were wavering and so at 11 a.m. he ordered his infantry to counter-attack. By noon Schmettau's center was broken and forced back over the Lissbach Stream, Blücher's cavalry was blown, and Wartensleben was trying to reposition his troops. The Prussians realized all was now lost and the King ordered a withdrawal.

Davout's corps had lost 7,052 officers and men killed or wounded, while Prussian casualties were 13,000.

== Aftermath ==
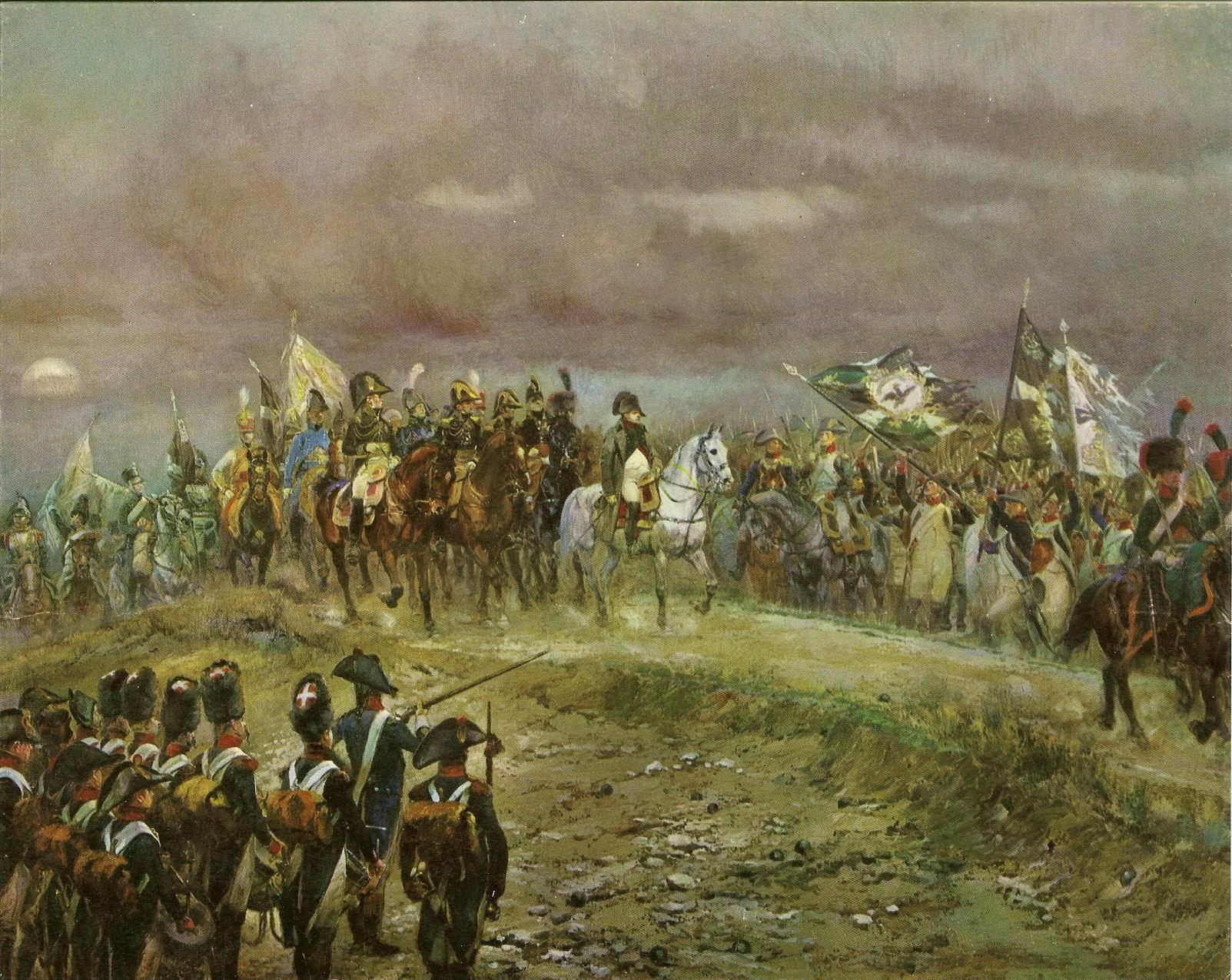
Napoleon after the Battle of Jena.

Napoleon initially did not believe that Davout's single Corps had defeated the Prussian main body unaided and responded to the first report by saying "Your Marshal must be seeing double!", a reference to Davout's poor eyesight. As matters became clearer, however, the Emperor was unstinting in his praise. Davout was made Duke of Auerstedt. Lannes, the hero of Jena, was not so honored.

Bernadotte's lack of action was controversial within a week of the twin battles. Bernadotte had last received positive written orders on the day before the battle in which his I Corps, along with Davout's III Corps, were to lie astride the Prussians' projected line of retreat. He was the only Marshal not to receive updates, written orders on the night of 13 October. In the early hours of 14 October, Davout received a courier from Berthier in which he wrote: "If the Prince of Ponte Corvo [Bernadotte] is with you, you may both march together, but the Emperor hopes that he will be in the position which had been indicated at Dornburg." Davout thence relayed this order to Bernadotte when they next met at 0400 the same morning. Bernadotte later cited the poorly written, equivocal nature of the verbal order, as discretionary and complied with Napoleon's wish to be at Dornburg instead of accompanying Davout. Moreover, when told of Davout's difficulties, Bernadotte did not believe that the Prussian main force was before III Corps as Napoleon had claimed the main body was at Jena. As a consequence, he failed to aid Davout and instead fulfilled the Emperor's orders to position I Corps in the Prussian rear on the Heights of Apolda, which, incidentally, did have the effect intended as the Prussians at Jena withdrew once they saw French troops occupying their line of retreat.

Davout and Bernadotte later became bitter enemies as the result of Bernadotte's perceived indifference at the fate of a fellow Marshal. For his part, Napoleon later stated on St. Helena that Bernadotte's behavior (though he was complying with Napoleon's orders) was disgraceful and that but for his attachment to Bernadotte's wife, Napoleon's own former fiancée, Désirée Clary, he would have had Bernadotte shot. However, contemporary evidence indicates that far from scenes of recriminations and insults alleged by Davout and his aides-de-Camp against Bernadotte the night of the battles, Napoleon was unaware anything was amiss, inasmuch as I Corps had played the part assigned to it by the Emperor, until days later.

A later search of the orders and dispatches from the Imperial Headquarters never yielded any order for Bernadotte to march with Davout. They did, however, confirm Berthier's order of 14 October, sending Bernadotte to Dornberg. The lack of documentation supporting Napoleon's accusation against Bernadotte calls into question whether Napoleon had intended I Corps to march with Davout, and the order was incorrectly transmitted to Bernadotte on the morning of 14 October, or if Napoleon was using the opportunity to shift blame for Davout having to fight a battle on his own as suggested by Colonel Ernst Marsh Lloyd. Napoleon later sent a severely worded reprimand to Bernadotte but took no further action.

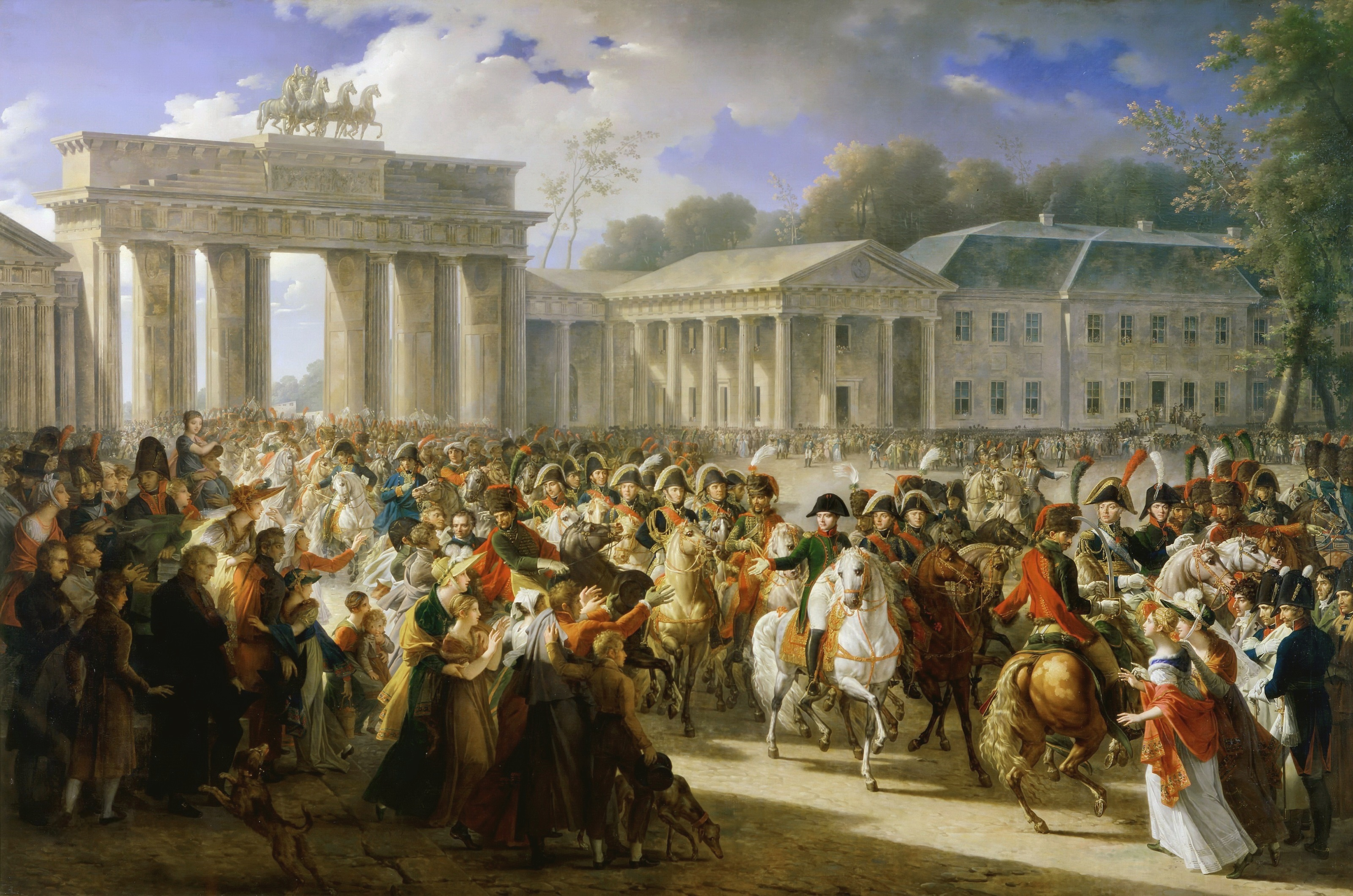
Entry of Napoleon into Berlin by Charles Meynier. French troops entering Berlin following the battle.

On the Prussian side, Brunswick was mortally wounded at Auerstedt, and over the next few days, the remaining forces were unable to mount any serious resistance to Murat's ruthless cavalry pursuit. In the Capitulation of Erfurt on 16 October, a large body of Prussian troops became prisoners with hardly a shot being fired. Bernadotte crushed Eugene Frederick Henry, Duke of Württemberg's Prussian Reserve Army on the 17th in the Battle of Halle, partially redeeming himself in Napoleon's eyes. In recognition of his glorious victory at Auerstadt, Napoleon gave Davout the honor of entering Berlin first. Davout led his exhausted III Corps into Berlin in triumph on 25 October. Hohenlohe's force surrendered on 28 October after the Battle of Prenzlau, followed soon after by the Capitulation of Pasewalk. The French ran down and captured several small Prussian columns at Boldekow on 30 October, Anklam on 1 November, Wolgast on 3 November, and Wismar on 5 November.

21,000 Prussian field troops remained at large west of the Oder as November began under the command of Gebhard Blücher. French advances prevented his corps from crossing the Oder, or moving toward Stettin to seek waterborne transport to East Prussia. Bernadotte began a relentless pursuit of Blücher, with the two forces engaging in several holding actions, and was later joined by Murat and Soult in "The Pursuit of the Three Marshals". Blücher then moved west to cross into neutral Denmark but the Danes placed their army on the border with the intent of attacking any force that tried to cross it. The Prussians then violated the neutrality of the Hanseatic City of Lübeck and fortified it with the intent of joining forces with an allied Swedish contingent there on its way home, and commandeering ships in the hopes of reaching a safe harbor. However, Blücher and Winning's corps was surrounded and destroyed in what became the Battle of Lübeck on 6 and 7 November after Bernadotte's I Corps, still smarting from the Emperor's censure, stormed the fortified city gates, poured into the streets and squares breaking hasty attempts at resistance and captured Blücher's command post (and his Chief of Staff Gerhard von Scharnhorst) as Soult's troops blocked all escape routes. The Prussians lost 3,000 killed and wounded. On the morning of 7 November, with all hope of escape extinguished, Blücher surrendered personally to Bernadotte and went into captivity with 9,000 other Prussian prisoners of war. The Siege of Magdeburg ended on 11 November with Ney's capture of the fortress. Isolated Prussian resistance remained, but Napoleon's primary foe was now Russia, and the Battle of Eylau and the Battle of Friedland awaited.

Martin van Creveld has stated about the effects on command:

Thus Napoleon at Jena had known nothing about the main action that took place on that day; had forgotten all about two of his corps; did not issue orders to a third, and possibly a fourth; was taken by surprise by the action of a fifth; and, to cap it all, had one of his principal subordinates display the kind of disobedience that would have brought a lesser mortal before a firing squad. Despite all these faults in command, Napoleon won what was probably the great single triumph in his career.

== Influence ==
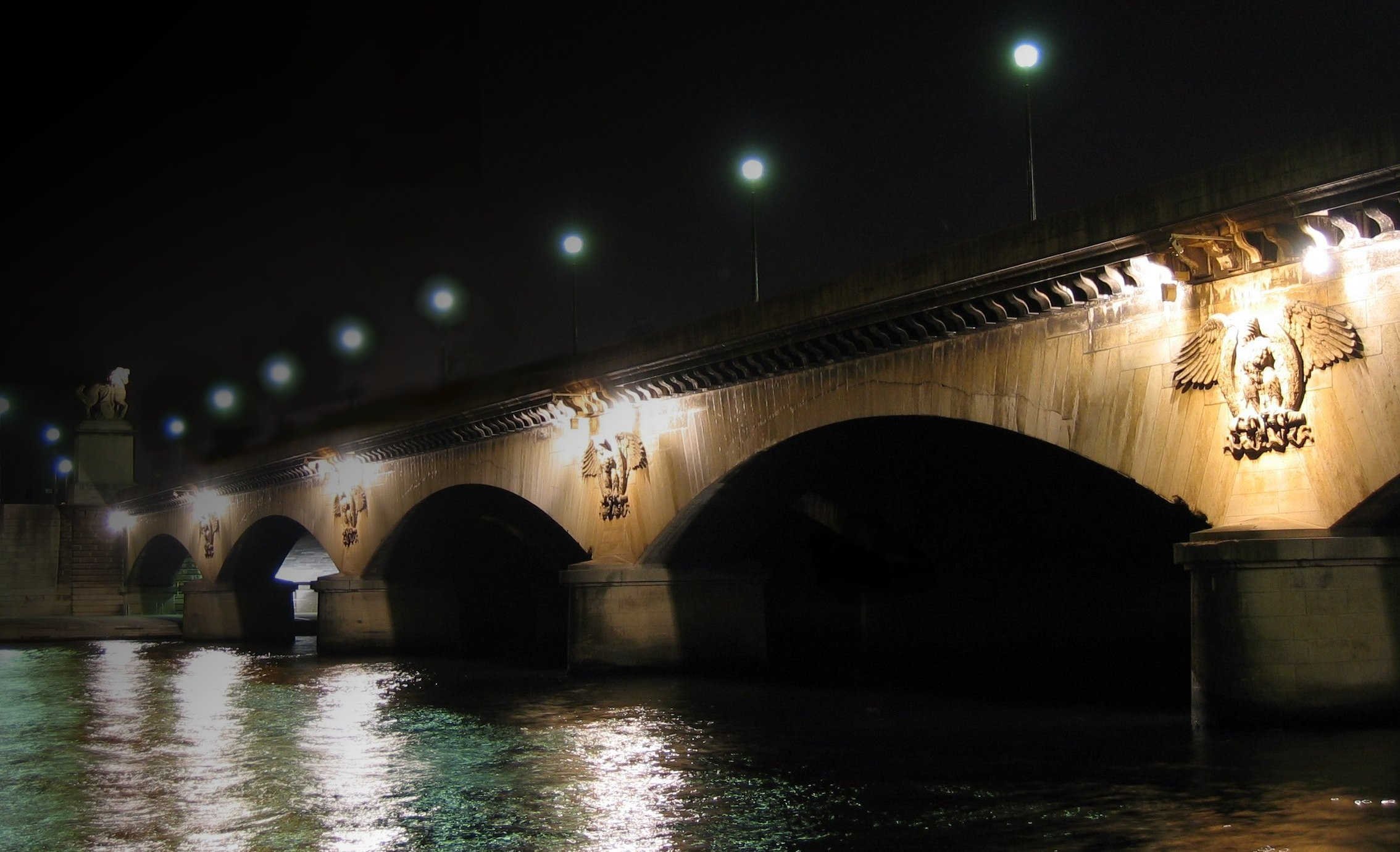
The Pont d'Iéna in Paris was built to commemorate the Battle of Jena.

The battle proved most influential in demonstrating the need for reforms in what was a very much feudal Prussian state and army. Important Prussian reformers like Scharnhorst, Gneisenau and Clausewitz served at the battle. Their reforms, together with civilian reforms instituted over the following years, began Prussia's transformation into a modern state. This modernized Prussia took the forefront in expelling France from Germany and eventually assumed a leading role on the continent. The reduction of Prussia to a French vassal, and the subsequent revolt that restored national honor, formed a key component of German nationalism.

Napoleon built a bridge in Paris which he named after the battle. When he was defeated, the Prussian contingent of the allied forces of occupation was so incensed by its name that they wished to destroy the bridge. Talleyrand temporarily renamed the bridge after the French Grand Army, which dissuaded them from doing so. The station of the Paris Metro at the bridge has the same name.

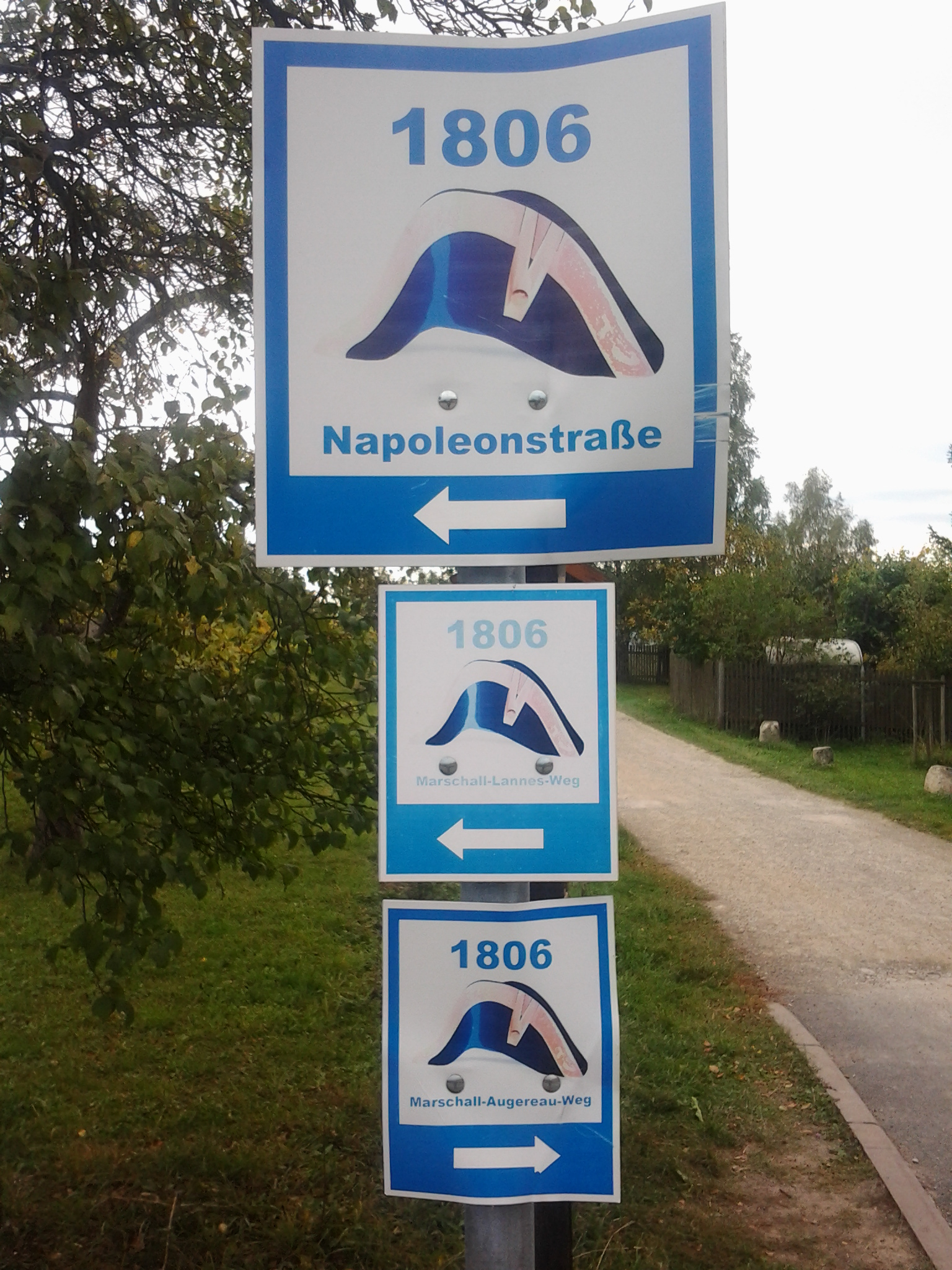
Three signs of trails near Jena named after Napoleon and his marshals Jean Lannes and Charles-Pierre Augereau

Near Jena, several hiking trails are named after Napoleon and some of his marshals. In the villages of Cospeda is a museum about the battle. To mark the 200th anniversary the battle was re-enacted on 14 October 2006 with 1,800 participants on a 600 by 800 meters enclosed area near the village of Cospeda. Annually in October, close to the historical date, commemorative events are organized by the association "Jena 1806 e. V.". This takes place on a grander scale every five years. The award winning short film "Into the Battle" by David Cebulla was produced during the 210th anniversary reenactment of the battle.

== See also ==
- Military career of Napoleon Bonaparte

== Notes ==
Preceded by Battle of Saalfeld	Napoleonic Wars; Battle of Jena–Auerstedt	Succeeded by Capitulation of Erfurt
