= Cieszeniewo =

- Village
- Location within Poland
- Coordinates: 53°45′26″N 15°54′43″E
- Country: Poland
- Voivodeship: West Pomeranian
- County: Świdwin
- Gmina: Świdwin
- Population: 220

Cieszeniewo [t͡ɕɛʂɛˈɲɛvɔ] (German: Ziezeneff) is a village in the administrative district of Gmina Świdwin, within Świdwin County, West Pomeranian Voivodeship, in north-western Poland. It lies approximately 10 km (6 mi) east of Świdwin and 96 km (60 mi) north-east of the regional capital Szczecin.

For the history of the region, see History of Pomerania.

The village has a population of 220.

== Notable residents ==
- Ernst von Rüchel (1754–1823), Prussian general
