= Auerstedt =

- Ortsteil of Bad Sulza
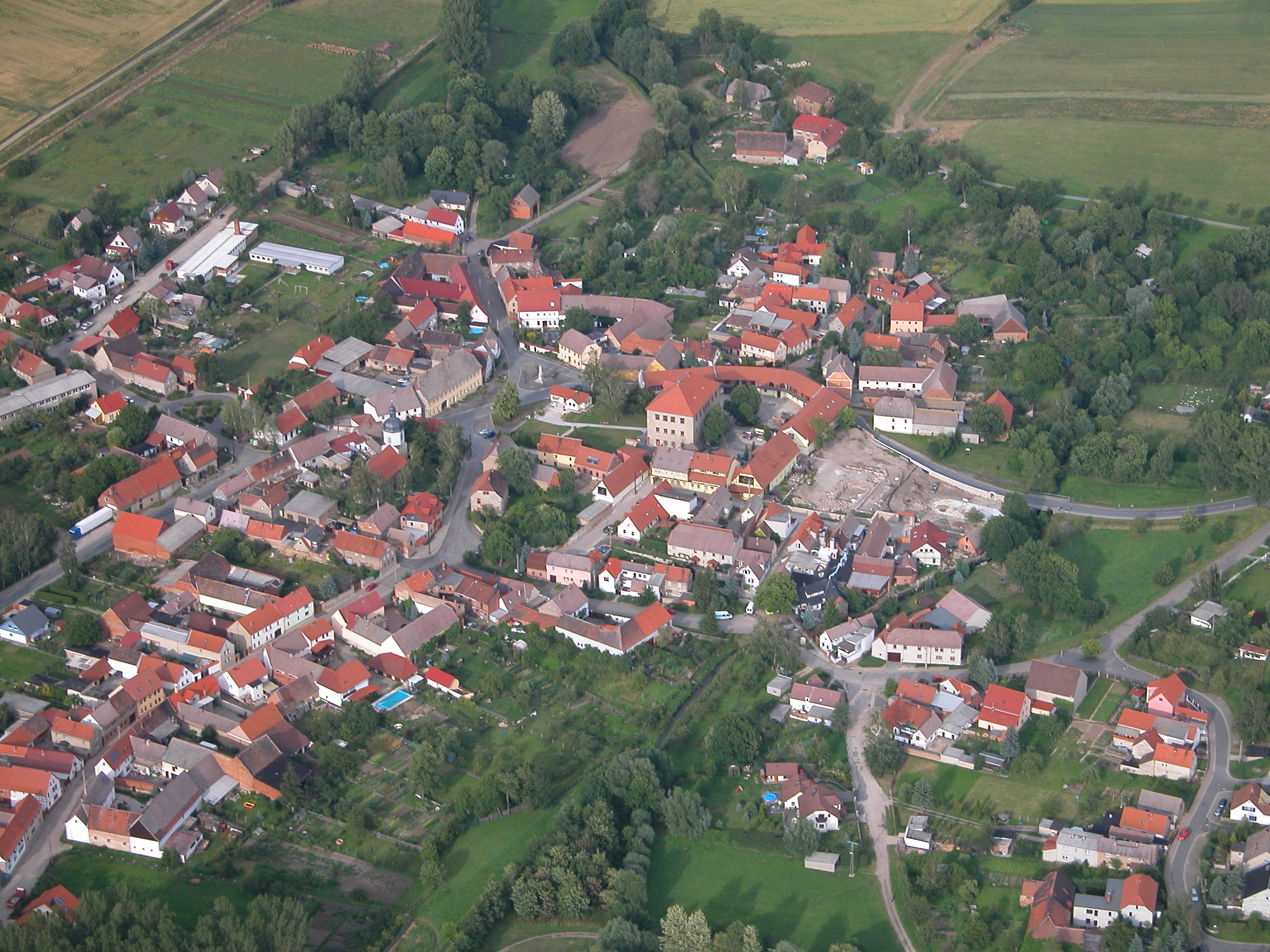
- Aerial view of Auerstedt
- Interactive map of Auerstedt
- Location within Germany Location within Thuringia
- Coordinates: 51°5′58″N 11°35′15″E
- Country: Germany
- State: Thuringia
- District: Weimarer Land
- Town: Bad Sulza

Area
  - Total: 8.48 km^{2} (3.27 sq mi)
- Elevation: 150 m (490 ft)

Population (2011-12-31)
  - Total: 457
  - Density: 53.9/km^{2} (140/sq mi)
- Time zone: UTC+01:00 (CET)
  - Summer (DST): UTC+02:00 (CEST)
- Postal codes: 99518
- Dialling codes: 036461
- Vehicle registration: AP
- Website: www.bad-sulza.de

Auerstedt [ˈaʊ̯ɐ.ʃtɛt] is a village and a former municipality in the Weimarer Land district of Thuringia, Germany. Since 31 December 2012, it is part of the town Bad Sulza. It lies 25 miles (40 km) northeast of Weimar. On October 14, 1806, the Battle of Auerstedt, a decisive victory for Napoleon I of France, took place near Auerstedt. As a result, the leader of the victorious French forces, Louis-Nicolas Davout, was appointed duc d'Auerstaedt.
