= David Cebulla =

German director and filmmaker of nature documentaries

David Cebulla ([ˈdaːvɪt tseːbʊla] born in 1991 in Jena) is a German filmmaker and director of nature documentaries.

== Life ==
=== Early life ===
David Cebulla studied biology and ecology at the University of Jena and conducted dendrochronological research on the climate adaptedness of individual tree species. From 2015 onwards, he worked on sets of various film productions, including for the ZDF, Warner Bros. and as assistant director for the series teaser of "Azur". From 2016 to April 2018, he was social media and artist manager for the wildlife and nature filmmaker Andreas Kieling. Since 2019, Cebulla has been a full-time filmmaker.

=== Work as nature filmmaker (2019–present) ===
Cebulla produces mainly documentaries about nature and wildlife. His films are released on video-on-demand, including Prime Video, Vimeo on Demand, and Pantaray TV, as well as on DVD. He shows his films to audiences and holds presentations. In film production, Cebulla uses ecological methods to record wildlife and appears as a protagonist himself. His own productions are known for featuring only wildlife, but no animals from game enclosures.

In 2016, he made the short film "Hidden Beauty – The Orchids of the Saale Valley," in which he searched for some of Germany's rarest orchid species. In 2020's "The Return of the Wildcat", Cebulla went in search of the European wildcat, documenting genetic evidence as well as rare footage of individuals living in the wild. In 2022, he released the film "Wild Forests," for which he spent a year observing life in forests without any forestry activity and documenting wildlife in its natural habitat.

By his own account, he is currently working on the to date most extensive film project about the Common hamster. For "The Last Common Hamsters" he filmed wild common hamsters in Germany, rare black common hamsters, cemetery hamsters in Vienna, hamster breeding for reintroduction in France, small-scale farming in Poland, hamster hunting in Hungary, and common hamsters in the steppes of Kazakhstan.

== Filmography (selection) ==
- Hidden Beauty – The Orchids of the Saale Valley (2017) – director and producer
- The Return of the Wildcat (2020) – director and producer
- Wild Forests (2022) – director and producer
- The Last Common Hamsters (2025) – director and producer
- The Secret Life of Fox Cubs (2026) – director and producer

== Awards (selection) ==
General

- 2018: Medal "People 2017" for special cultural achievements in Thuringia
- 2019: Walter Dexel Scholarship from the City of Jena

Hidden Beauty – The Orchids of the Saale Valley

- 2018: International Film Competition Nature and Adventure Dortmund – nature film: winner
- 2019: Virgin Spring Cinefest – Film on nature / environment / wildlife: winner (gold)
- 2019: International Open Film Festival (IOFF) – Film on nature / environment / wildlife: best award

The Return of the Wildcat

- 2020: Virgin Spring Cinefest – Film on nature / environment / wildlife: winner (gold)
- 2020: Nature Without Borders International Film Festival – Wildlife/ nature documentaries: excellence
- 2022: Tulum World Environment Film Festival – Jury's Award Feature Films: Ocean and Wildlife Conservation: winner

Wild Forests

- 2023: Virgin Spring Cinefest – Film on nature / environment / wildlife: winner
