= La maraude =

Napoleonic military tactic of scavenging in favour of supply lines

La maraude describes the tactic employed by Napoleonic armies of scavenging local villages or enemy populations for supplies instead of relying on extended lines of supply. It was Napoleon's belief that armies should be largely self-sufficient, as this freed them from the constraints of supply lines and allowed them to move far more quickly than their more static enemies. The tactic proved very successful in western and central Europe but was less successful in the more desolate regions of Spain and Russia where food was less plentiful. Marauding enabled French soldiers to develop a high degree of skill in living off the country. The tactic was particularly flawed whenever an army was forced to retreat over land which it had already scavenged as in the retreat from Moscow.

== Requisitioning vs. marauding ==
Napoleon's armies officially obtained food and shelter supplied by the local population through requisitions. Additional food was to be purchased from local traders or from sutlers. This system worked well in densely populated regions where surplus provided adequate provisions. The requisition system was often supplemented by marauding; this form of pillaging was often forbidden but usually tolerated to an extent. However, Napoleon sometimes ordered summary executions for disobeying orders.

== Disadvantages ==
Uncontrolled la maraude tactics often resulted in violence or devastation. There are many accounts of rape, murder, and massacre of locals. In certain regions, pillaging was so severe and violent that the local populations rose up in revolt. Such forms of resistance caused these locals to be deemed enemies of the Revolution. Some marauding soldiers were killed by vengeful peasants or hanged by military authorities as an example. La maraude sometimes left a trail of destruction in the army's path. Soldiers dismantled houses and buildings to obtain firewood, metal scraps, and other materials. The tactic was largely unsuccessful in regions that were too poor to have a surplus or that were already pillaged and barren. The Grande Armée famously encountered these problems in Russia in 1812. Local populations had fled the region, and the Russian armies, upon their retreat, had destroyed anything that may have been useful to their enemies. Napoleon's troops lacked supplies on their advance into the Russian empire, and were even more devastated upon retreat from Moscow. The unsustainable characteristics of la maraude tactics contributed to Napoleon's demise.
