= Ernst von Rüchel =

Prussian infantry general (1754–1823)

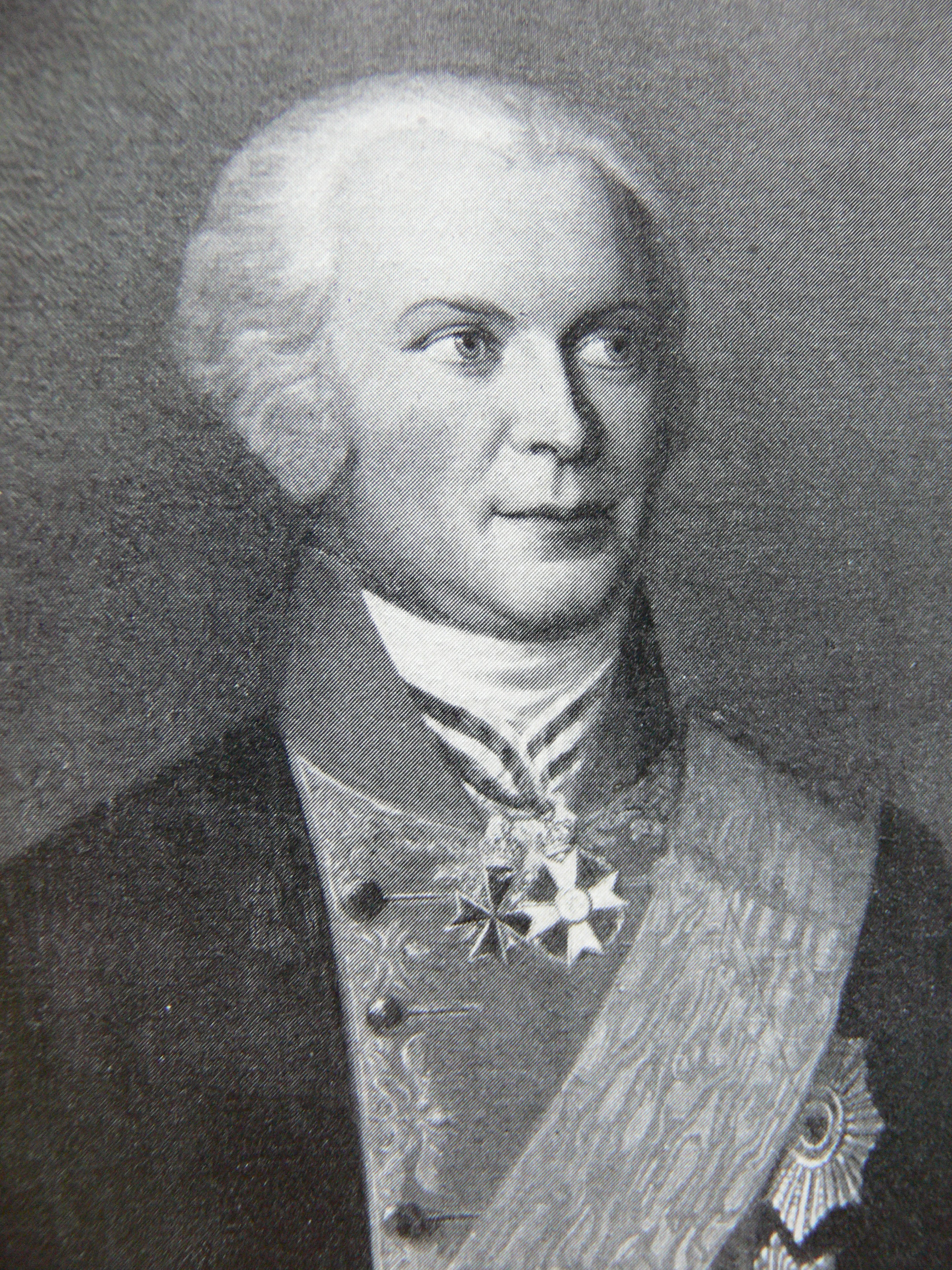
- Ernst von Rüchel
- Born: 21 July 1754; Ziezeneff, Pomerania
- Died: 14 January 1823 (aged 68); Haseleu, Pomerania
- Military career
- Allegiance: Kingdom of Prussia
- Branch: Infantry
- Rank: General of the Infantry
- Conflicts: French Revolutionary Wars; Napoleonic Wars
- Other work: Chief, Infantry Regiment Nr. 2, 1805

Ernst von Rüchel (21 July 1754 – 14 January 1823) was a Prussian general who led an army corps in a crushing defeat by Napoleon at the Battle of Jena on 14 October 1806. He commanded troops from the Kingdom of Prussia in several battles during the French Revolutionary Wars in 1793 and 1794. Afterward he held various appointments as a diplomat and a military inspector. In 1806 during the Napoleonic Wars he held an important army command but has been criticized for his actions at Jena. Wounded, he managed to escape the French pursuit, but never commanded troops in combat again.

== Early career ==
Rüchel was born on 21 July 1754 in Ziezeneff in Prussian Pomerania (modern Cieszeniewo, Poland).

With the rank of Oberst (colonel), Rüchel fought against the French First Republic during the War of the First Coalition. During the Siege of Mainz from 10 April to 23 July 1793, he commanded a brigade consisting of the Thadden and Legat Fusilier Battalions and the Wolframsdorf Grenadier Battalion. After promotion to General-major, he led the Prussian contingent during the Second Battle of Wissembourg in December 1793. The units coming under his orders were eight battalions in the Infantry Regiments Kleist Nr. 12, Wolframsdorf Nr. 37, and Hertzberg Nr. 47, two foot jäger companies, three squadrons of the Wolfradt Hussar Regiment Nr. 6, one and one-half horse artillery batteries, and a half 6-pound foot battery.

On 23 May 1794, Rüchel led a column in a Prussian victory at the Battle of Kaiserslautern. On this occasion he led three battalions each of the Infantry Regiments Rüchel Nr. 30 and Wolframsdorf, the Ernst Fusilier Battalion Nr. 19, three foot jäger companies, three squadrons each of the Eben Hussar Regiment Nr. 2 and Voss Dragoon Regiment Nr. 11, two foot artillery batteries, and one horse artillery battery. At the Peace of Basel in 1795, Prussian abandoned the First Coalition to concentrate her energies on the Third Partition of Poland.

== 1806 and later ==
In 1806 Rüchel was the commander-in-chief of the Infantry Regiment Nr. 2. During the War of the Fourth Coalition, Rüchel was given command of the westernmost of the three Prussian armies. The other two armies were led by Charles William Ferdinand, Duke of Brunswick and Frederick Louis, Prince of Hohenlohe-Ingelfingen. In early October, Hohenlohe's army assembled near Rudolstadt and Brunswick's at Erfurt. Rüchel's army was split between Eisenach and Gotha with Karl August, Grand Duke of Saxe-Weimar-Eisenach's division farther south at Schmalkalden and Johann Friedrich von Winning's detachment at Vacha.

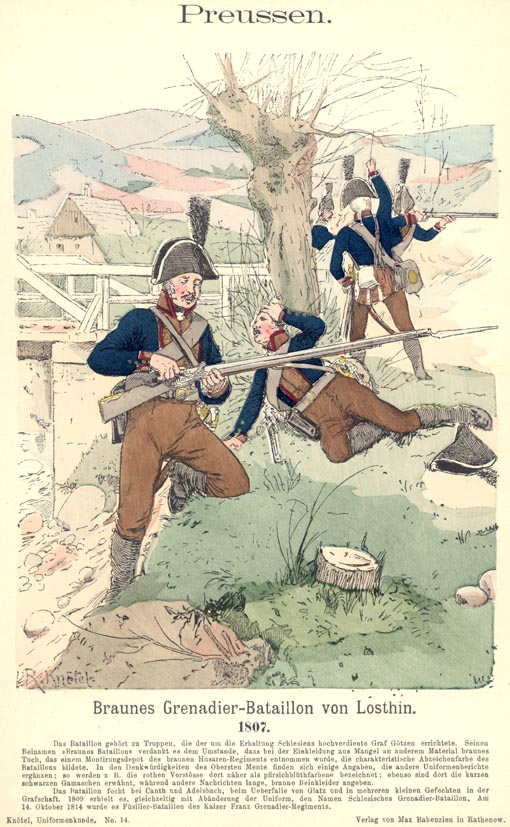
Prussian grenadiers 1807

Emperor Napoleon I of France thrust his 180,000-man army through the Franconian Forest, winning the Battle of Schleiz on 9 October and the Battle of Saalfeld on 10 October. The Prussian high command concentrated their armies on the west bank of the Saale River. They planned for Brunswick to move north toward Halle, while Hohenlohe covered his eastern flank by defending at Jena. On 14 October, Brunswick's army ran head on into Louis Davout's III Corps near Auerstedt and was badly defeated. Meanwhile, Napoleon fell on Hohenlohe at the Battle of Jena with the bulk of his army. Rüchel had been told to stay at Weimar until Saxe-Weimar's division arrived. He made the soldierly decision to march at once with his 15,000 available troops to assist Hohenlohe. Unfortunately, by the time his corps arrived, the battle was lost.

Historian David G. Chandler argued that Rüchel was unfairly criticized for his belated appearance. He received news of the battle at 9:00 AM and left his camp at Weimar immediately. His troops marched five kilometers in one hour, then they deployed from march columns into platoon columns with flank guards out and the artillery at the ready. At 10:30 AM, he got a misleading note from Hohenlohe saying that the battle was going well. Around noon Hohenlohe sent him another message asking for immediate assistance. Just before his troops reached Kapellendorf around 1:00 PM, a courier brought news that the Prussian army was defeated. It took Rüchel a total of four hours to move 12 kilometers, including the time it took to break camp; this was not a slow pace by Prussian standards. He brought 15,000 troops and 40 field pieces to the battlefield. Altogether, there were 25 squadrons from five cavalry regiments, three foot jäger companies, 14 musketeer battalions from seven infantry regiments, four fusilier battalions, two grenadier battalions, three foot batteries, and two horse batteries.

Christian Karl August Ludwig von Massenbach, Hohenlohe's chief of staff, directed Rüchel to move east from Kapellendorf. Dutifully, he advanced his corps across the Herressener Bach in echelon order, but with both flanks in the air. Chandler noted that the unwise decision to attack was Hohenlohe's. Soon after it was committed to battle, Hohenlohe rode up to take personal command of the corps. Though the French V Corps of Marshal Jean Lannes was stopped in its tracks, Rüchel's left was soon turned by one of Marshal Nicolas Soult's IV Corps divisions. Instructing his cavalry to cover a retreat, Rüchel ordered his infantry to fall back. His cavalry came under a terrific bombardment by French artillery and the regiments were thrown into confusion. At this moment, Marshal Joachim Murat directed the French Reserve Cavalry into the contest, with a division of cuirassiers in the lead. Without cavalry protection, Rüchel's troops were ridden over and sent fleeing to the rear in irretrievable rout.

Wounded, Rüchel narrowly avoided capture during the next few weeks. During the maneuvers that ended in the Battle of Eylau on 7 and 8 February 1807, Rüchel commanded the 4,000-strong Prussian garrison of Königsberg. At that time, Anton Wilhelm von L'Estocq led the 9,000-man Prussian field force.

Rüchel died on 14 January 1823 in Haseleu, Pomerania.
