= Battle of Waren-Nossentin =

1806 Battle during the War of the Fourth Coalition

- Part of the War of the Fourth Coalition
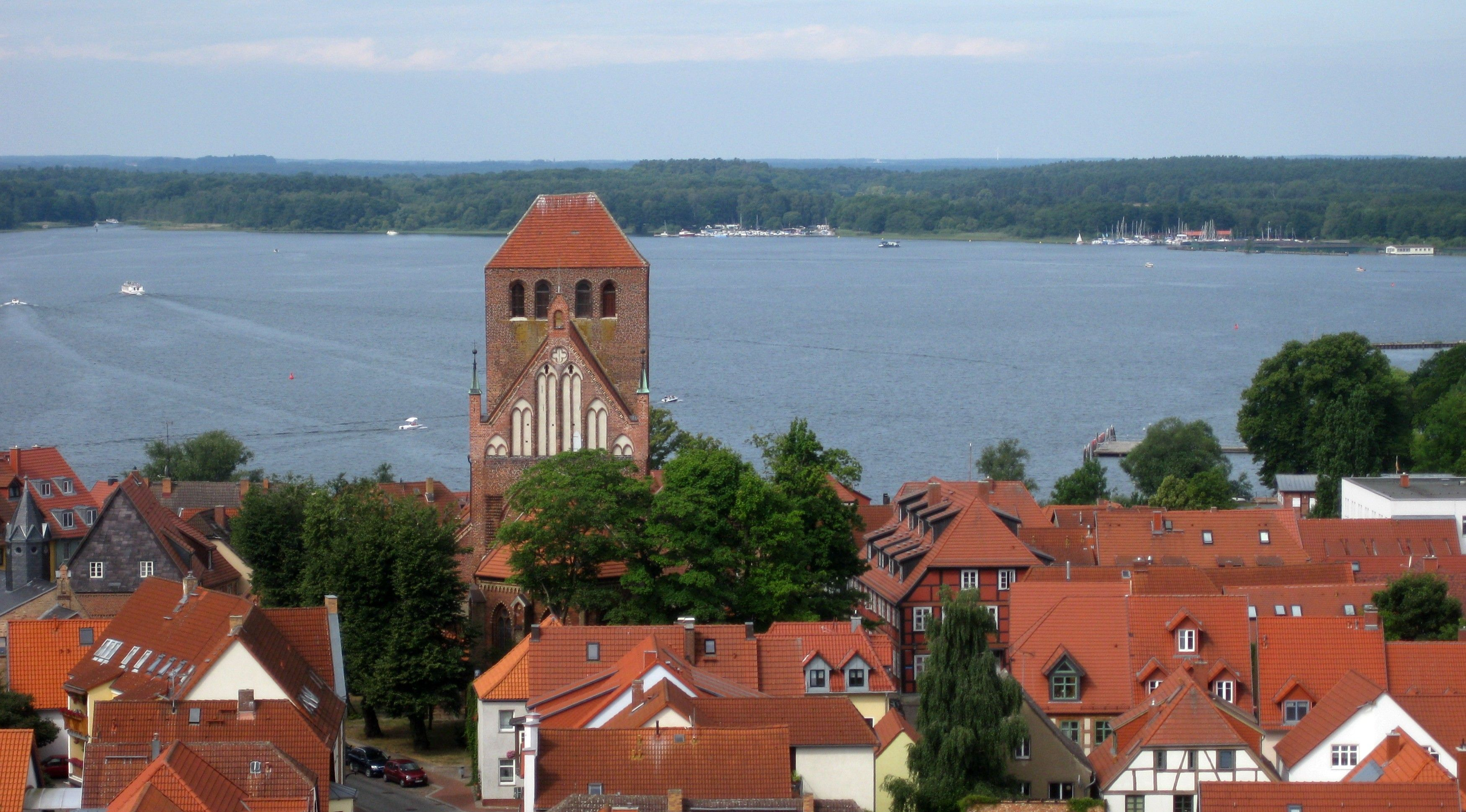
- View of Müritz Lake from St. Mary's Church tower in Waren
Date	1 November 1806
Location	Waren (Müritz), Germany 53°31′N 12°41′E
Result	Prussian victory

Belligerents
Kingdom of Prussia	(France) French Empire

Commanders and leaders
(Kingdom of Prussia) August von Pletz (Kingdom of Prussia) Ludwig Yorck	(France) Jean-Baptiste Bernadotte (France) Claude-Étienne Guyot

Strength
4,000–5,000; 4 guns	12,000

Casualties and losses
Waren: 26; Nossentin: Unknown	Waren: over 46; Nossentin: Unknown

War of the Fourth Coalition
⬤ current battle
⬤ Napoleon not in command
⬤ Napoleon in command

The Battle of Waren-Nossentin on 1 November 1806 saw soldiers of the Kingdom of Prussia led by August Wilhelm von Pletz and Ludwig Yorck von Wartenburg fight a rear guard action against troops of the First French Empire commanded by Marshal Jean-Baptiste Bernadotte. Though forced to give ground, the Prussians successfully kept the French from inflicting serious loss or cutting off any units in this War of the Fourth Coalition action. Waren lies on the northern end of Lake Müritz, about 70 kilometres (43 mi) southeast of Rostock. Nossentin is a small village on the Fleesen See (Fleesen Lake) about 15 kilometres (9 mi) due west of Waren.

After the Battle of Jena-Auerstedt on 14 October 1806, Emperor Napoleon launched an all-out pursuit of the defeated Prussians. At the end of October, the French cut off and captured large numbers of Prussian soldiers near Prenzlau and Stettin. Gebhard Leberecht von Blücher's corps evaded capture by turning back to the west. Near Waren, Blücher linked up with another Prussian corps and the combined force withdrew to the west.

As the Prussian rear guard pulled out of Waren, the first French cavalry attacked. This action started an all-day battle between Pletz and Yorck's troops and the French. Though Bernadotte attacked vigorously, the Prussians got away intact after several clashes. In contrast to their dismal performance to date, the Prussians acquitted themselves well in this fight.

== Background ==
The Battle of Prenzlau on 28 October 1806 ended with the capitulation of General of Infantry Frederick Louis, Prince of Hohenlohe-Ingelfingen with his surviving 10,000 Prussian troops to Marshal Joachim Murat. This disaster was followed by the Capitulation of Pasewalk on 29 October and the Capitulation of Stettin on 30 October. In the next few days, the French mopped up the Prussian forces in the area in a series of surrenders at Boldekow on 30 October, Anklam and Küstrin on 1 November, and Wolgast on 2 and 3 November.

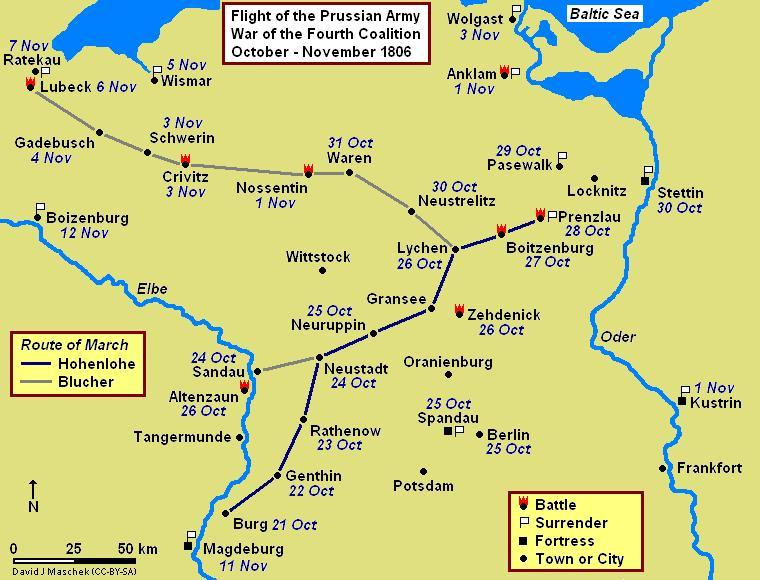
Prenzlau-Lubeck Campaign, October–November 1806, showing the march routes of Hohenlohe and Blücher

Since 24 October, General-Leutnant Blücher had served as Prince Hohenlohe's rear guard commander. The commander of the I Corps, Marshal Bernadotte picked up news of Hohenlohe on the 25th when he was at Brandenburg an der Havel and determined to follow the Prussians. From Nauen, the I Corps moved northeast on the 26th, to reach Oranienburg on the 27th. Moving north, the French arrived at Furstenberg on the 28th before turning northeast to reach Boitzenburg on the 29th. On 30 October, Bernadotte received reports that Blücher turned back to Neustrelitz.

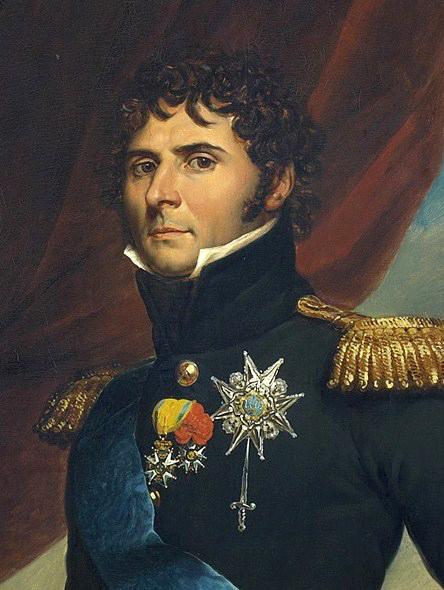
Marshal Bernadotte

Bernadotte sent Colonel Étienne Maurice Gérard with his 2nd Hussar Regiment to harass the Prussian retreat and turned his corps northwest on the 30th. Besides capturing 400 soldiers and a number of wagons, Gérard secured the information that Blücher was headed for Waren. That evening, Bernadotte's troops made it to Burg Stargard, 8 kilometres (5 mi) southeast of Neubrandenburg. At this time Marshal Nicolas Soult's IV Corps was at Wusterhausen, just north of Neustadt an der Dosse.

On 31 October, Blücher joined the column under General-Leutnant Johann Friedrich von Winning near Waren. Winning's force, originally led by General Karl August, Grand Duke of Saxe-Weimar-Eisenach, missed the Battle of Jena-Auerstedt on 14 October and had been trailing Blücher ever since. Winning wanted to reach Rostock to the north, and, to this end, he ordered General-Major Karl Georg Friedrich von Wobeser to move ahead and prepare the port for evacuation. However, Blücher called off the Rostock operation in favor of his own idea, which was to cross to the west bank of the Elbe at Boizenburg. He hoped to join with General Karl Ludwig von Lecoq in the former Electorate of Hanover or with General-Leutnant Franz Kasimir von Kleist at Magdeburg. To that end he sent officers to collect boats and supplies in the area. Blücher organized his army into two corps. He gave Winning command of the 11,000-man I Corps, while retaining control of the 10,000-strong II Corps. The Prussians had a particularly powerful cavalry contingent, with 80 squadrons total. Each corps was subdivided into two heavy and one light divisions.

Altogether, 47,252 French troops were hunting for Blücher. Bernadotte had 15,450, Soult led 24,375, General of Division Louis Michel Antoine Sahuc's 4th Dragoon Division numbered 2,550 troopers, General of Division Emmanuel Grouchy's 2nd Dragoon Division had 2,432 horsemen, General of Brigade Antoine Lasalle counted 785 hussars, and General of Division Jean-Joseph Ange d'Hautpoul's 2nd Cuirassier Division included 1,660 cavalrymen. Bernadotte dropped off his least fit men at Neubrandenburg and pressed on with 12,000. Meanwhile, Murat and his cavalry were sweeping west through Western Pomerania.

== Battle ==
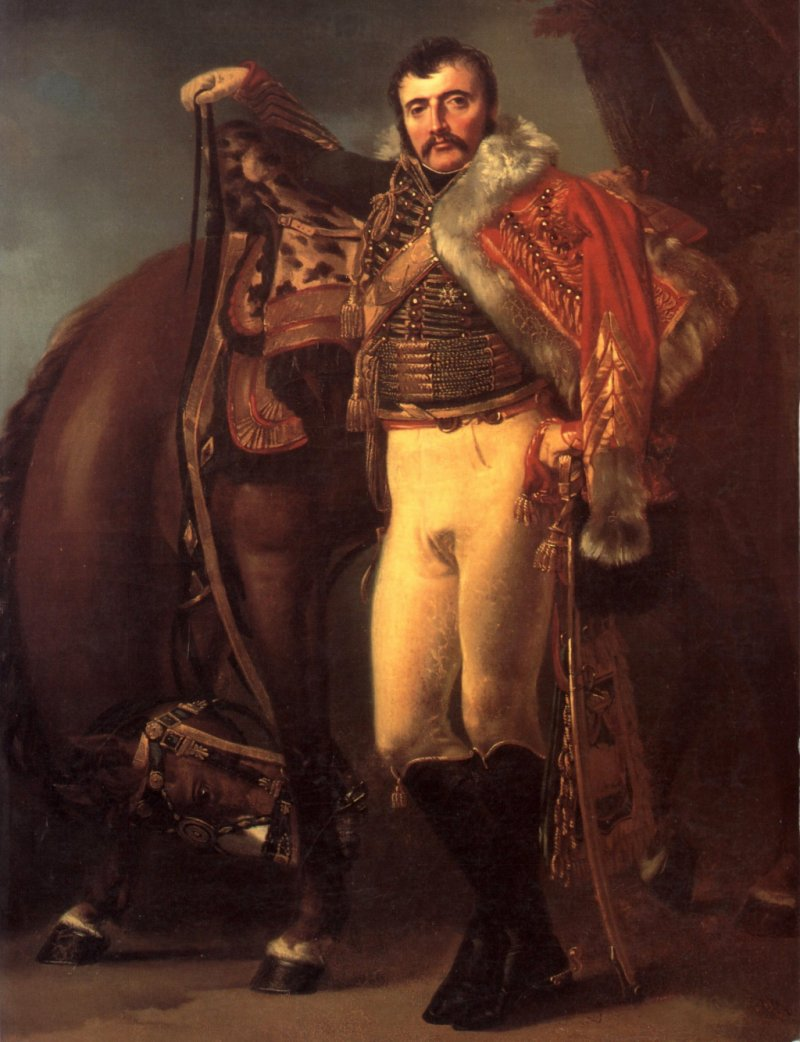
Claude-Étienne Guyot

On the morning of 1 November, the Prussians left Waren. Blücher moved to the northeast via Hohen Wangelin, covered by a rear guard under General-Major Friedrich Gottlieb von Oswald. Winning marched east along the north shore of several lakes, covered by Oberst von Pletz's rear guard. That morning in Waren, Colonel Claude-Étienne Guyot with the 400-strong 22nd Chasseurs à Cheval from Soult's corps surrounded and captured Major Schmude and 170 dragoons. However, when Guyot tried to advance from the town, Pletz counterattacked with 850 horsemen of the Köhler Hussar Regiment # 7. For a loss of only one killed, 15 wounded, and 10 missing, the Prussian hussars threw Guyot's cavalry back into Waren and freed Schmude and his men. The French lost six officers killed or wounded, over 40 men captured, and an unknown number killed or wounded in this minor Prussian victory.

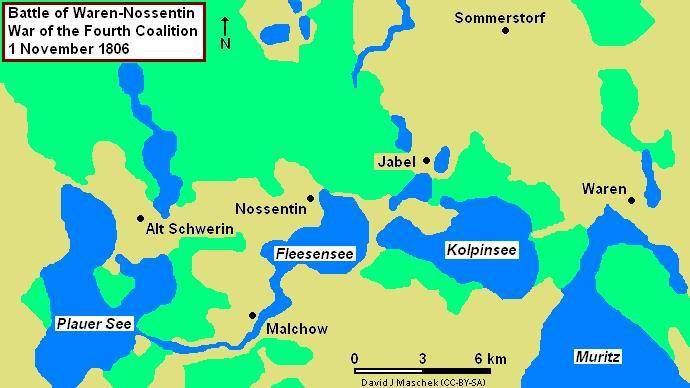
Battle of Waren-Nossentin, 1 November 1806, showing forests and lakes.

After Guyot's discomfiture, Bernadotte's cavalry arrived in Waren to give the French six regiments in the area. General of Brigade Jacques Louis François Delaistre de Tilly led the I Corps cavalry, consisting of the 2nd and 4th Hussar Regiments and 5th Chasseur à Cheval Regiment. General of Brigade Pierre Margaron commanded the IV Corps cavalry, including the 8th Hussar Regiment, and 11th, 16th, and 22nd Chasseur à Cheval Regiments. Smith lists seven regiments, not six. Either Petre was mistaken about six regiments or one of Margaron's was not present at Waren. On the outskirts of Waren, the French light cavalry began a series of skirmishes with the Prussian horsemen that lasted from 10:00 a.m. to 1:00 p.m. Meanwhile, the Prussian rear guard under Yorck took a defensive position between two lakes at the village of Jabel. The lakes near Jabel are the Jabelscher See to the south and the Loppiner See to the north. (Note: This observation was confirmed at Google Earth.)

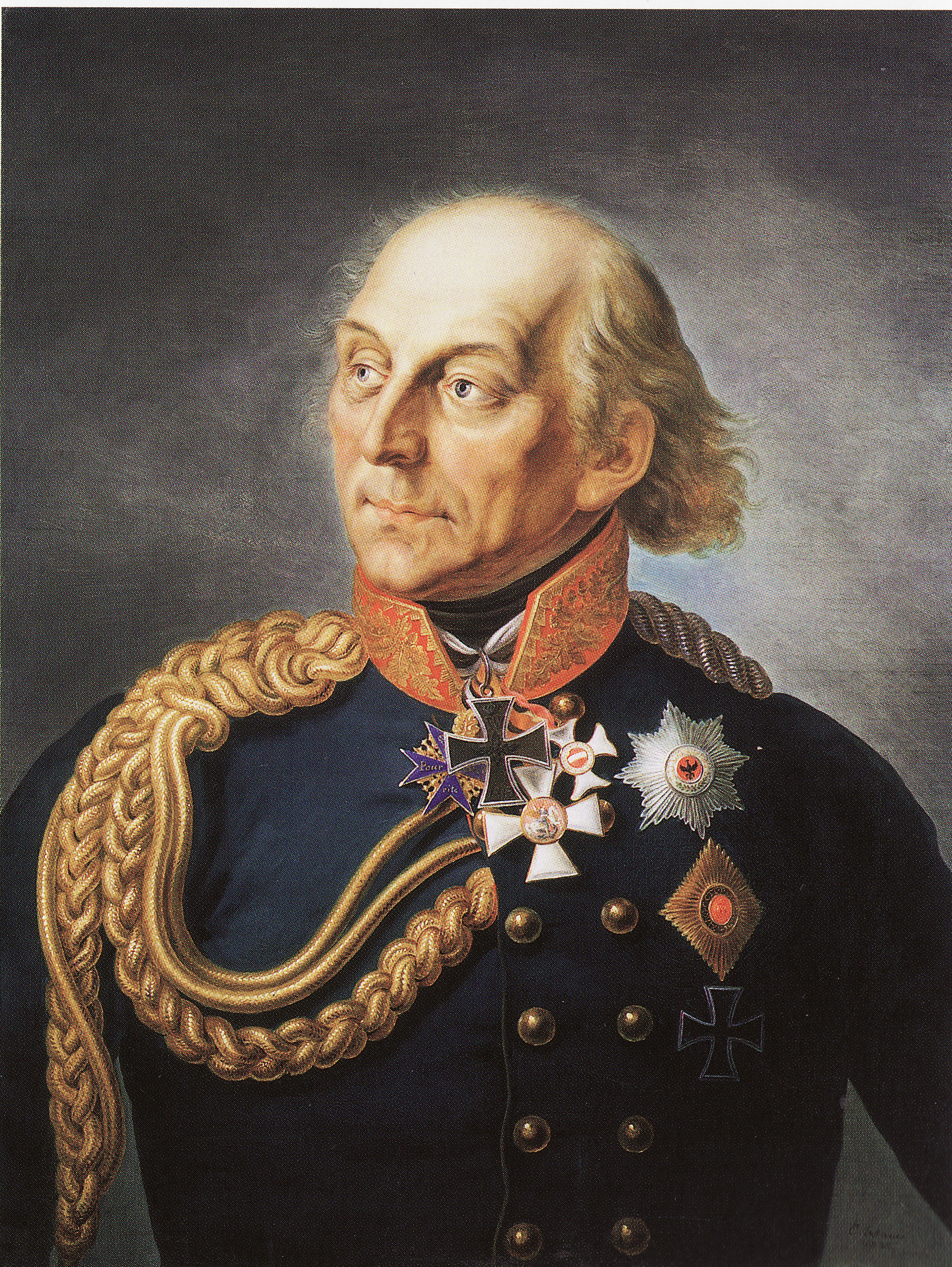
Ludwig Yorck

While historian Francis Loraine Petre notes that Pletz was the rear guard commander, he credits Yorck with the tactical control of the battle. Under Yorck's direction were three fusilier battalions, six jäger companies, and 20 squadrons of hussars. General of Division Anne Jean Marie René Savary arrived with a task force consisting of the 1st Hussar and 7th Chasseurs à Cheval Regiments, giving the French a total of eight cavalry regiments. Savary detected Oswald's rear guard at Sommerstorf northwest of Waren and prepared to attack, but Bernadotte recalled him to Jabel. The two sides exchanged artillery fire at Jabel for an hour before Yorck pulled back into the woods toward Nossentin. Spearheaded by the 9th Light Infantry Regiment of General of Division Pierre Dupont de l'Etang's division, the French pressed ahead into the woods to be met by vigorous resistance from the Prussian jägers and fusiliers.

At length, Bernadotte's force passed the western edge of the wood to find Yorck's men drawn up awaiting them. The Prussian right flank rested on the Fleesen Lake, the center on Nossentin village, and the left flank on marshy ground. Yorck deployed his infantry in the front line with his horsemen in the rear. After a French hussar regiment was repulsed from Nossentin, Bernadotte committed General of Division Jean-Baptiste Drouet, Comte d'Erlon's division to the attack. Drouet's seven-battalion division included of the 27th Light Infantry, and the 94th and 95th Line Infantry Regiments.

At the same time the marshal tried to turn the Prussian left flank with his cavalry. The cavalry attack failed amid marshes and water-filled ditches, but Drouet drove Yorck's men out of the village after a hard fight. During the ineffectual cavalry maneuvers, Bernadotte was thrown from his horse and ridden over by the 5th Chasseurs à Cheval Regiment. Yorck retreated to Alt Schwerin, reaching there at 10:00 p.m. that evening.

== Result ==
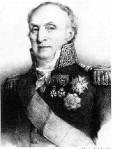
General Drouet

Later, Bernadotte claimed to have fought 12,000 or more Prussians, while Soult estimated there were between 5,000 and 6,000 enemies. Petre, who gives no casualty figures, suggested that the Prussians had only about 2,000 infantry and 2,000 cavalry available, in addition to a half battery of horse artillery, plus regimental guns. Since a Prussian horse battery comprised six 6-pound guns and two 7-pound howitzers, Yorck's half-battery must have had four guns. Gunther E. Rothenberg states that the fusilier battalions did not use regimental guns in 1806.

When Murat heard about the fighting at Waren and Nossentin, he abandoned his march on Rostock and decided to march to the I Corps' assistance. He later found that Bernadotte and Soult joined hands and realized that they did not need his help. Petre credits the Prussian success to Yorck's tactical competence and the fact that his troops missed the Jena-Auerstedt disaster. Yorck sensed when each of his positions became untenable and issued orders to fall back just in time. In his after battle report, Bernadotte admitted that his enemies fought well, but tried to minimize the action. Savary criticized Bernadotte for not supporting his cavalry with infantry attacks. The French pursuit continued until Blücher was crushed at the Battle of Lübeck on 6 November.

== Notes ==
Preceded by Capitulation of Stettin	Napoleonic Wars; Battle of Waren-Nossentin	Succeeded by Battle of Lübeck
