= Geysen =

Geysen or Geijsen is a Dutch patronymic surname meaning "Gijs' son". Notable people with the surname include:

- Bettina Geysen (born 1969), Belgian politician
- Frans Geysen (1936–2026), Belgian composer and writer on music
- Willy Geysen (born 1940s), Belgian engineer

Variants:

- Carry Geijssen (born 1947), Dutch speed skater
- Chris Gheysens (born 1971), American business executive

== See also ==
- Geysen Glacier, Antarctic glacier named after Hendrick Geysen
- Gijsen, surname of the same origin
- Oliver Geissen (born 1969), German television presenter
