= Gisbert =

Name

Gisbert is a given name and surname. Notable people with the name include:

== People with the given name ==
- Gisbert Combaz (1869–1941), Belgian artist
- Gisbert Flüggen (1811–1859), German painter
- Gisbert Haefs (born 1950), German writer and translator
- Gisbert Hasenjaeger (1919–2006), German mathematical logician
- Gisbert Horsthemke, German footballer
- Gisbert Kapp (1852–1922), Austrian-English electrical engineer
- Gisbert Schneider (1934–2018), German professor for organ and improvisation
- Gisbert Steenwick (1642–1679), Dutch composer, organist, and carillonneur
- Gisbertus Voetius (1589–1676), Dutch Calvinist theologian
- Gisbert Wüstholz, German mathematician
- Gisbert Zarambaud (born 1997), Central African footballer
- Gisbert zu Knyphausen (born 1979), German singer-songwriter
- Friedrich Gisbert Wilhelm von Romberg (1729–1809), German officer
- Wilhelm Gisbert Groos, German WW1 flying ace

== People with the surname ==
- Antonio Gisbert (1834–1901), Spanish artist
- Blaise Gisbert (1657–1731), French Jesuit rhetorician and critic
- Carlos Diego de Mesa Gisbert (born 1953), Bolivian historian, journalist, and politician
- Francesc Capdevila Gisbert (born 1956), birth name of Max (Spanish cartoonist)
- Greg Gisbert (born 1966), American jazz trumpeter and flugelhornist
- Joan Manuel Gisbert (born 1949), Spanish writer of children's literature
- Jorge Gisbert, Spanish tennis player
- José María Gisbert, Spanish tennis player
- Juan Gisbert Sr. (born 1942), Spanish tennis player
- Juan Gisbert Schultze, Spanish tennis player
- Teresa Gisbert (1926–2018), Bolivian architect and historian

== See also ==
- Gisbert (TV series), 1999 German TV series
- Gijsbert, a Dutch given name
- Gizbert, a surname
- Gisberta Salce Júnior, Brazilian trans woman
