= Gijsen =

Gijsen is a Dutch patronymic surname meaning "Gijs' son". Among variant forms are Geijssen, Geysen, Ghijsen, Giesen, and Gijzen. Notable people with the surname include:

- Joannes Gijsen (1932–2013), Dutch Roman Catholic bishop
- Marnix Gijsen pseudonym of Jan-Albert baron Goris (1899–1984), Belgian writer
- Wim Gijsen (1933–1990), Dutch science fiction and fantasy writer

Variants:

- Geurt Gijssen (born 1934), Dutch chess referee
- Dyon Gijzen (born 1994), Dutch football striker
- Peeter Gijsels (1621–1690), Flemish Baroque painter
