= Claude-Étienne Guyot =

French cavalry general

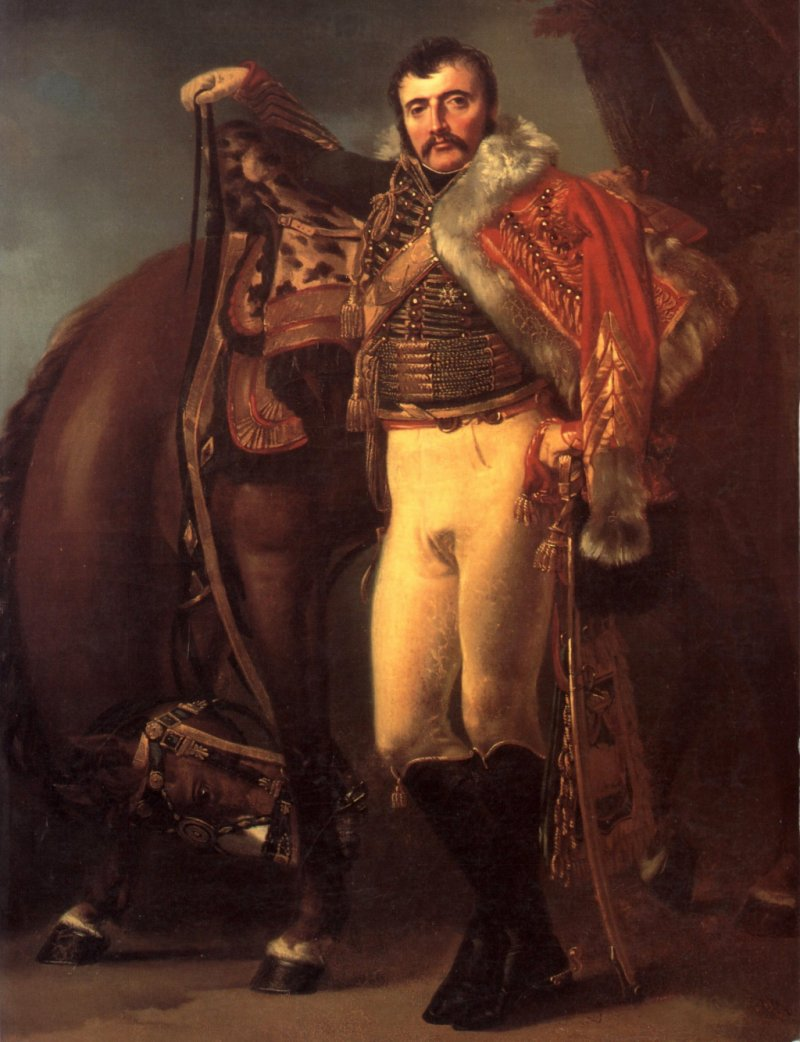
- Count Claude-Étienne Guyot portrayed while he was a colonel in the Grande Armée. Painting by Antoine-Jean Gros.
- Born: 5 September 1768; Villevieux, France
- Died: 28 November 1837 (aged 69); Paris, France
- Military career
- Allegiance: Kingdom of France (1791–1792), French First Republic, First French Empire, Bourbon Restoration
- Branch: Cavalry
- Service years: 1790–1816, 1830–1833
- Rank: General of Division
- Conflicts: French Revolutionary Wars; Napoleonic Wars
- Awards: Baron, later Count of the Empire
- Other work: Chamberlain of the Emperor

Claude-Étienne, comte Guyot (English: /ɡiːˈjoʊ/ ghee-YOH, French: [klod etjɛn gɥijo]; 1768–1837) was a French general of the French Revolutionary Wars and Napoleonic Wars, noted for commanding cavalry.

== Early career during the Revolutionary Wars ==
Joining the army in November 1790 as a mere trooper of the chasseurs-à-cheval of Brittany, he subsequently served in the Army of the Rhine and of the Moselle, then in the Vendée, in Italy and in Germany, during the French Revolutionary Wars. In 1802 he became a captain of the first Regiment of chasseurs-à-cheval of the Consular Guard.

== Napoleonic Wars ==
Guyot took part to the Wars of the Third and Fourth Coalition with the Grande Armée, holding the rank of squadron commander in the Guard chasseurs-à-cheval regiment and being noted for bravery at the Austerlitz and Eylau. He fought at the minor Battle of Waren-Nossentin on 1 November 1806. A colonel in the Imperial Guard in 1807, he was created a baron of the Empire the next year and given a position in Lefebvre-Desnouettes's Guard light cavalry, commanding the Emperor's escort during the latter's brief campaign in Spain. In 1809, after the bloody battle of Aspern-Essling, Guyot was given the function of colonel commander of the Guard chasseurs-à-cheval and six weeks later he led a famous charge at the battle of Wagram. This action would bring him the rank of brigadier general. A Chamberlain of Emperor Napoleon I from March 1810, he was subsequently sent to Spain, where he won a promotion to general of division in 1811. During the Russian campaign and subsequent War of the Sixth Coalition, Guyot would serve as commander of the Guard chasseurs-à-cheval. In the 1813 campaign in Saxony, he was wounded at the battle of Lützen and led a brilliant charge at the battle of Bautzen, before being made prisoner at the battle of Kulm, in August. Released after an exchange of prisoners, Guyot took part to the epic battle of Leipzig, before being created a count of the Empire in November of that year. The 1814 campaign in France saw general Guyot at the heart of the action, commanding cavalry at La Rothière, Champaubert and Craonne.

== 1814 incident and beyond ==
In February 1814, General Guyot suffered a career-threatening incident, while he was commanding the Imperial Guard heavy cavalry. After the battle of Vauchamps, Guyot left the Guard horse artillery company that was attached to his division in an exposed position, with orders to join him in a precise location at nightfall. Guyot did not leave behind a cavalry escort and a guide, which resulted in the artillery company being ambushed that night, with the loss of some cannon and an entire platoon, killed or prisoner. These facts were immediately reported to the colonel commander of the Guard horse artillery, but nobody dared to inform Emperor Napoleon. Eventually, Marshal François Joseph Lefebvre was also informed and he went to the Emperor with the bad news. The Emperor immediately demanded a complete briefing and, upon hearing that the artillery company in question was under Guyot's command, he sent for him at once. Seeing Guyot, Napoleon aggressively criticized him for the incident and, after Guyot attempted to put the blame on the artillery company captain, Napoleon began a furious rant, blaming Guyot for the defeat at Brienne and for his failure to protect the artillery during this battle. He went on to criticize him for the fact that the Guard cavalry was always absent when needed, that it was not present to defend its Emperor on several occasions, including at Champaubert. Napoleon then axed Guyot on the spot and turned to his commander, General Etienne de Nansouty, telling him to notify General Rémi Joseph Isidore Exelmans that he had been appointed at the head of the Guard heavy cavalry, in replacement of Guyot.

After Napoleon's abdication, Guyot was named commander of the 'Royal Corps of Cuirassiers', formerly Grenadiers à Cheval de la Garde Impériale. Nevertheless, during the Hundred Days, Guyot rallied to Napoleon's cause and he was again given the command of the Guard heavy cavalry division, at the head of which he charged at Waterloo, where he was wounded twice. After the fall of the Empire, he was placed on the retired list at his own request, returning to active service briefly between 1830 and 1833 to command the 10th military division.

== Recognition ==
The name Guyot is inscribed under the Arc de Triomphe in Paris.

== Sources ==
- (in French) Fierro, Alfredo; Palluel-Guillard, André; Tulard, Jean - "Histoire et Dictionnaire du Consulat et de l'Empire”, Éditions Robert Laffont, ISBN 2-221-05858-5
- Smith, Digby. The Napoleonic Wars Data Book. London: Greenhill Books, 1998. ISBN 1-85367-276-9
- (in French) Thoumas, Charles A. -"Les grands cavaliers du Premier Empire", Série II, Ellibron Classics
- (in French) Tulard, Jean - "Dictionnaire Napoléon”; volume 1, Librairie Artème Fayard, 1999, ISBN 2-213-60485-1
