= Gizbert =

Gizbert is a surname. Notable people with the surname include:

- Richard Gizbert (fl. 1983), Canadian broadcast journalist
- Tomasz Gizbert-Studnicki (born 1948), Polish jurist and professor of legal sciences

== See also ==
- Gisbert
