= General Lasalle at the Siege of Stettin =

Painting by Antoine-Jean Gros

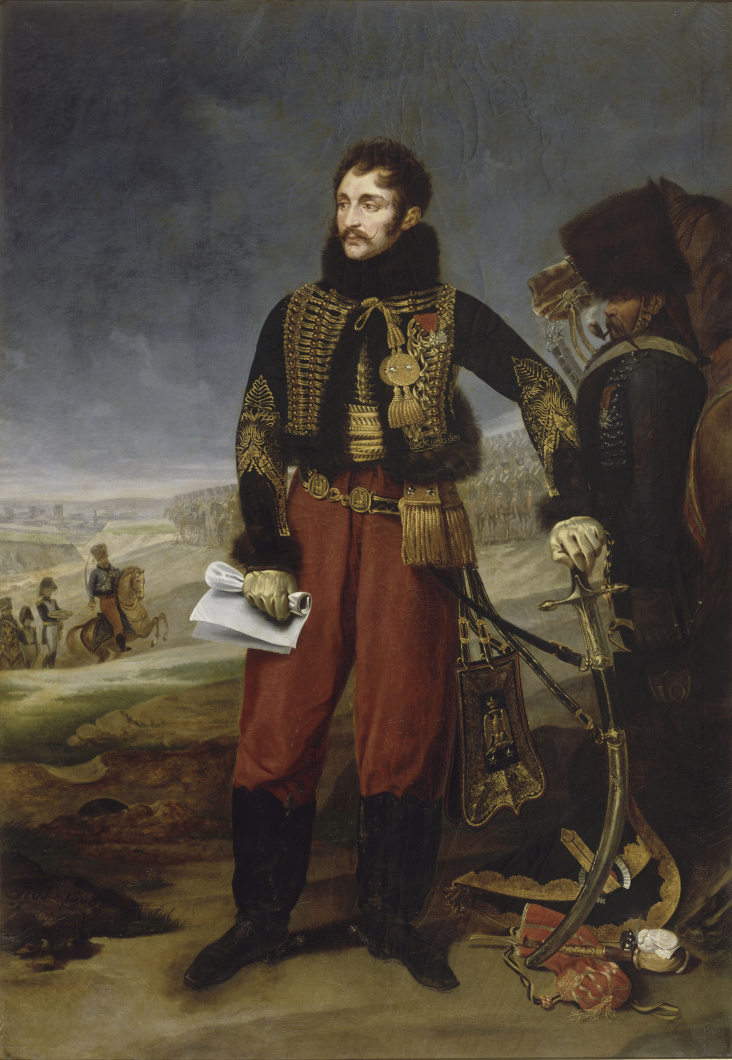
- Artist: Antoine-Jean Gros
- Year: 1808
- Type: Oil on canvas, portrait painting
- Dimensions: 248 cm × 174 cm (98 in × 69 in)
- Location: Army Museum; Paris

General Lasalle at the Siege of Stettin is an 1808 portrait painting by the French artist Antoine-Jean Gros. Combining portraiture with elements of history painting it depicts Antoine Charles Louis de Lasalle against the backdrop of the Siege of Stettin during the Napoleonic Wars.

It was displayed at the Salon of 1808 at the Louvre in Paris, the same year the artist enjoyed great success with his Napoleon on the Battlefield of Eylau. Acclaimed as one of the leaving history painters along with Jacques-Louis David, he was awarded the Legion of Honour by Napoleon at the end of the Salon. Today the painting is in the Army Museum in Paris. A replica is in the Museum of French History in the Palace of Versailles.

== Bibliography ==
- Escholier, Raymond. Gros, ses amis, ses élèves. Petit Palais, 1936.
