= Capitulation of Stettin =

1806 surrender during the War of the Fourth Coalition

- Part of the War of the Fourth Coalition
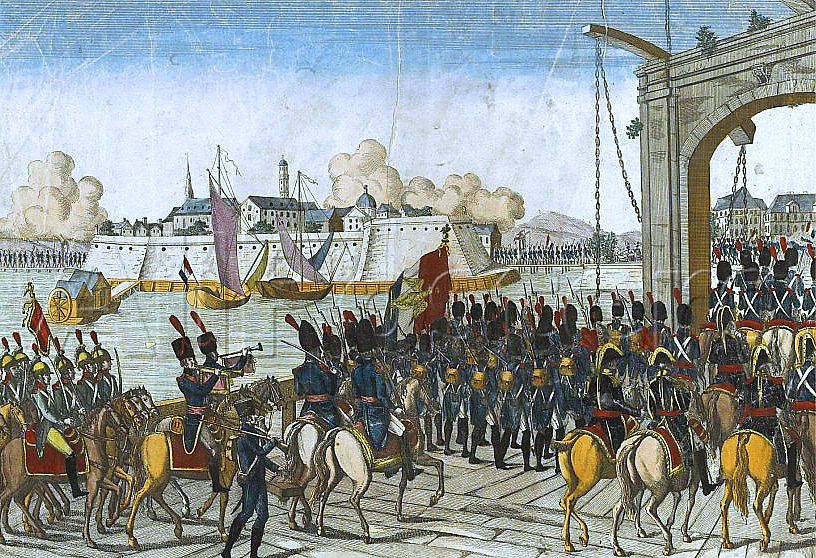
- Taking of Stettin by French troops in 1806
Date	29–30 October 1806
Location	Stettin, Prussia 53°25′57″N 14°32′53″E
Result	French victory

Belligerents
France	Prussia

Commanders and leaders
(First French Empire) Antoine Lasalle	(Kingdom of Prussia) Friedrich Romberg (surrendered)

Strength
500 men, 2 guns	5,300 men, 281 guns

Casualties and losses
None	5,300 captured, 281 guns captured

War of the Fourth Coalition
⬤ current battle
⬤ Napoleon not in command
⬤ Napoleon in command

In the Capitulation of Stettin on 29–30 October 1806, Lieutenant General Friedrich Gisbert Wilhelm von Romberg surrendered the garrison and fortress to a much smaller French light cavalry brigade led by General of Brigade Antoine Lasalle. This event was one of a number of surrenders by demoralized Prussian soldiers to equal or inferior French forces after their disastrous defeat at the Battle of Jena-Auerstedt on 14 October. Stettin, now Szczecin, Poland, is a port city on the Oder River near the Baltic Sea, about 120 kilometres (75 mi) northeast of Berlin.

After Jena-Auerstedt, the broken Prussian armies crossed the Elbe River and fled to the northeast in an attempt to reach the east bank of the Oder. Following a two-week chase, Marshal Joachim Murat intercepted over 10,000 Prussians at the Battle of Prenzlau and bluffed them into surrendering on 28 October. The following day, Lasalle's and another French light cavalry brigade induced 4,200 more Prussians to lay down their weapons in the Capitulation of Pasewalk. On the afternoon of the 29th, Lasalle appeared before the fortress of Stettin and demanded its surrender. A completely unnerved Romberg, believing he was confronted by 30,000 Frenchmen, entered into negotiations with Lasalle and surrendered Stettin that night. Estimates of the numbers vary between 500 French hussars of the 5th and 7th French Hussars and 5,000 to 6,000 Prussians within the garrison.

Within a week, the fortress of Küstrin capitulated and three isolated Prussian columns were hunted down and captured at Boldekow, Anklam, and Wolgast. This left only one Prussian corps at large between the Elbe and Oder, plus garrisons at Magdeburg and in the former Electorate of Hanover.

== Background ==
Emperor Napoleon I of France's Grande Armée shattered the Prussian-Saxon armies at the Battle of Jena-Auerstadt on 14 October 1806. In the wake of this catastrophe, the Prussian forces retreated to the Elbe River. Feldmarschall Charles William Ferdinand, Duke of Brunswick, commander of the main Prussian army at Auerstedt, was fatally wounded and died on 10 November at Altona. General of Infantry Ernst von Rüchel, badly wounded at Jena, left the army and later recovered. The commander at Jena, General of Infantry Frederick Louis, Prince of Hohenlohe-Ingelfingen assumed command of a large portion of the defeated Prussian army, while Lieutenant General Gebhard von Blücher took command of another column. Lieutenant General Karl August, Grand Duke of Saxe-Weimar-Eisenach, who had missed Jena-Auerstedt, brought up the rear with 12,000 troops.

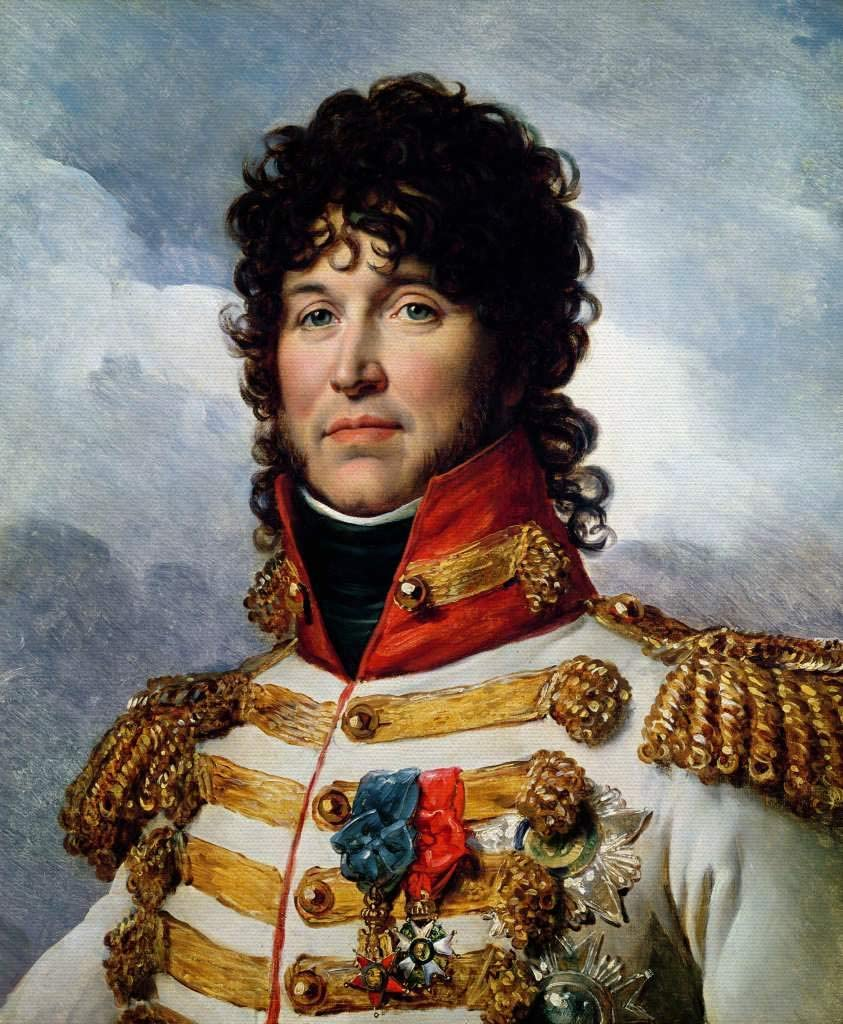
Joachim Murat

At Magdeburg, Hohenlohe joined Lieutenant General Eugene Frederick Henry, Duke of Württemberg whose Reserve was routed by Marshal Jean-Baptiste Bernadotte's I Corps at the Battle of Halle on 17 October with heavy losses. Leaving a large garrison in Magdeburg, Hohenlohe struck out for the Oder on 21 October. Blücher and Saxe-Weimar crossed the Elbe at Sandau between the 24th and 26th. Oberst Ludwig Yorck von Wartenburg fought a successful rear guard action at Altenzaun on the latter date against Marshal Nicolas Soult's IV Corps. Meanwhile, Murat's cavalry, Marshal Louis-Nicolas Davout's III Corps, and Marshal Jean Lannes' V Corps marched east toward Berlin, with Marshal Pierre Augereau's VII Corps not far behind. On 25 October, Davout's troops marched through Berlin and headed east for Küstrin and Frankfurt an der Oder. Meanwhile, Marshal Michel Ney's VI Corps began the Siege of Magdeburg. Seeing an opportunity to cut off Hohenlohe, Napoleon sent Murat, Lannes, and Bernadotte north from Berlin.

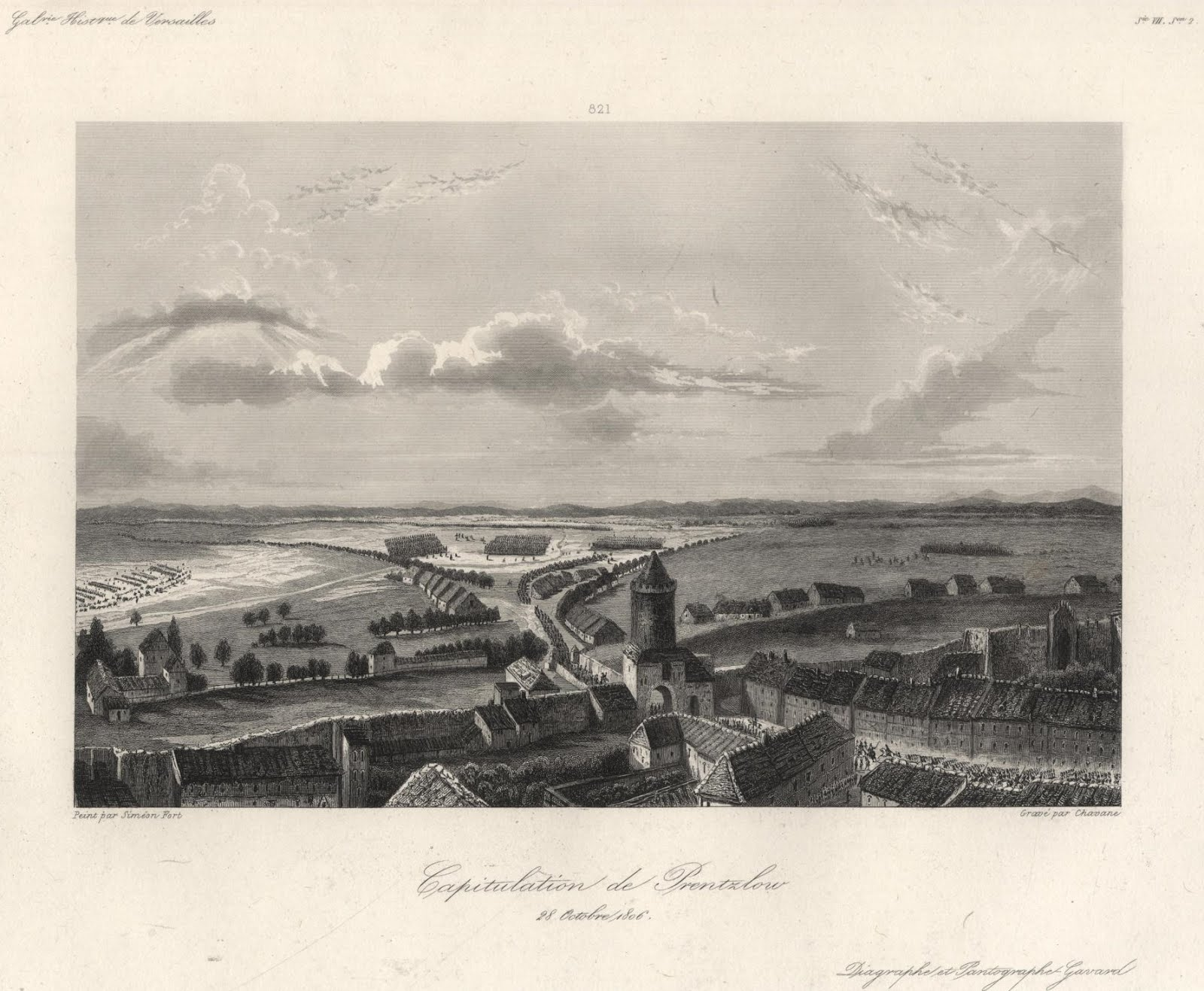
Surrender of Prenzlau

Murat routed General-Major Christian Ludwig Schimmelpfennig's 1,300-man flank guard at Zehdenick on 26 October. After losing 250 men, the survivors fled along the highway until they reached Stettin. The next day, General of Brigade Édouard Jean Baptiste Milhaud got across Hohenlohe's escape route at Boitzenburg. After a three-hour action, Hohenlohe drove off the French light cavalry brigade, but not before Murat's dragoons captured most of the Gensdarmes Cuirassier Regiment Nr. 10 which was acting as a flank guard. On 28 October, Murat finally ran Hohenlohe to earth at the Battle of Prenzlau. General of Division Emmanuel Grouchy's 2nd Dragoon Division cut a swath through the Prussian column of march, after which General of Division Marc Antoine de Beaumont's 3rd Dragoon Division captured the rear guard. With 3,000 of Lannes' infantry on hand in addition to Lasalle and the dragoons, Murat bluffed Hohenlohe into surrendering his remaining 10,000 troops by falsely claiming that the Prussians were surrounded by overwhelming forces.

After the surrender Lasalle rode on to Löcknitz on the road between Pasewalk and Stettin, reaching the village in the afternoon of the 28th. Milhaud's brigade marched north on the west bank of the Uecker River until he reached Pasewalk early on 29 October. Discovering Oberst von Hagen's force in the town, Milhaud demanded an immediate surrender. Hagen, finding Lasalle ahead of him and Milhaud behind him, surrendered 4,200 soldiers and eight guns in the Capitulation of Pasewalk.

== Capitulation ==
=== Stettin ===
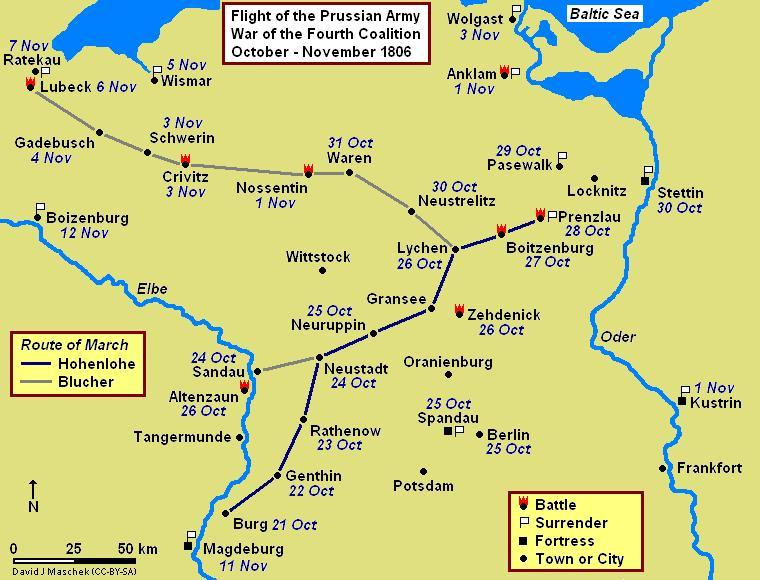
Prenzlau-Lubeck Campaign Map, October–November 1806

Lasalle marched to Stettin where he demanded its surrender in the early afternoon of 29 October. Lieutenant General Friedrich Gisbert Wilhelm von Romberg refused at first. At 4:00 p.m., Lasalle sent another summons to Romberg, this time with a threat of harsh treatment to the city. The French general claimed the Lannes' entire corps of 30,000 men was present. In fact, the V Corps advance guard got no nearer than Löcknitz that day. The elderly Prussian general entered negotiations and capitulated during the night of the 29/30 October.

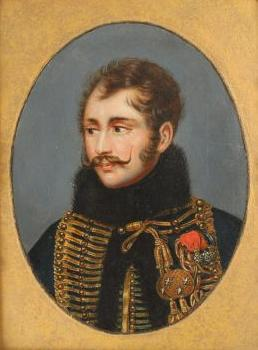
Antoine Lasalle

Romberg surrendered the Stettin fortress, 5,300 troops, and 281 guns. The Prussian garrison was made up of the remnants of Schimmelpfennig's and other forces, plus the 3rd battalions of the Kuhnheim Infantry Regiment Nr. 1, Arnim Infantry Regiment Nr. 13, Brunswick Infantry Regiment Nr. 21, Pirch Infantry Regiment Nr. 22, Winning Infantry Regiment Nr. 23, Möllendorf Infantry Regiment Nr. 25, and Larisch Infantry Regiment Nr. 26. One hundred officers were released on their word of honor not to fight against France while the common soldiers became prisoners of war. Lasalle's entire force consisted of 800 horsemen of the 5th and 7th Hussar Regiments plus two cannons.

Neither of two subordinate officers protested the capitulation, but instead agreed to surrender. These were General-Major Kurt Gottfried von Knobelsdorff, the fortress commandant and General-Major Bonaventura von Rauch, commander of Fort Prussia. In March 1809, Romberg was convicted and sentenced to life imprisonment for giving up Stettin without a fight. He died on 21 May 1809, two months short of his 80th birthday, before his punishment began.

Historian Francis Loraine Petre concluded that Stettin's surrender was "shameful". Its adequate garrison and supplies would have allowed it to sustain a siege. Even if the fortress was indefensible, there was nothing preventing the troops from crossing to the east bank of the Oder, joining their Russian allies, and continuing the war. Lannes wrote to Napoleon, "The Prussian army is in such a state of panic that the mere appearance of a Frenchman is enough to make it lay down its arms." Napoleon congratulated Murat:

My compliments on the capture of Stettin; if your light cavalry thus takes fortified towns, I must disband the engineers and melt down my heavy artillery.

=== Other surrenders ===
On the 28th, Blücher's artillery convoy marched through Neustrelitz at noon and reached Friedland five hours later. Earlier, it had been delayed by "perverse orders" from Hohenlohe's chief of staff Oberst Christian Karl August Ludwig von Massenbach. Hearing of Hohenlohe's capitulation, Major von Höpfner altered his march to the northeast toward Anklam the next day. At Boldekow, 14 kilometres (8.7 mi) south of Anklam, he encountered elements of Lannes' corps and surrendered on 30 October. Altogether, the French captured the Reserve Artillery Park and Park Column Nr. 5 with 600 soldiers, 800 horses, 25 field pieces, and 48 ammunition wagons.

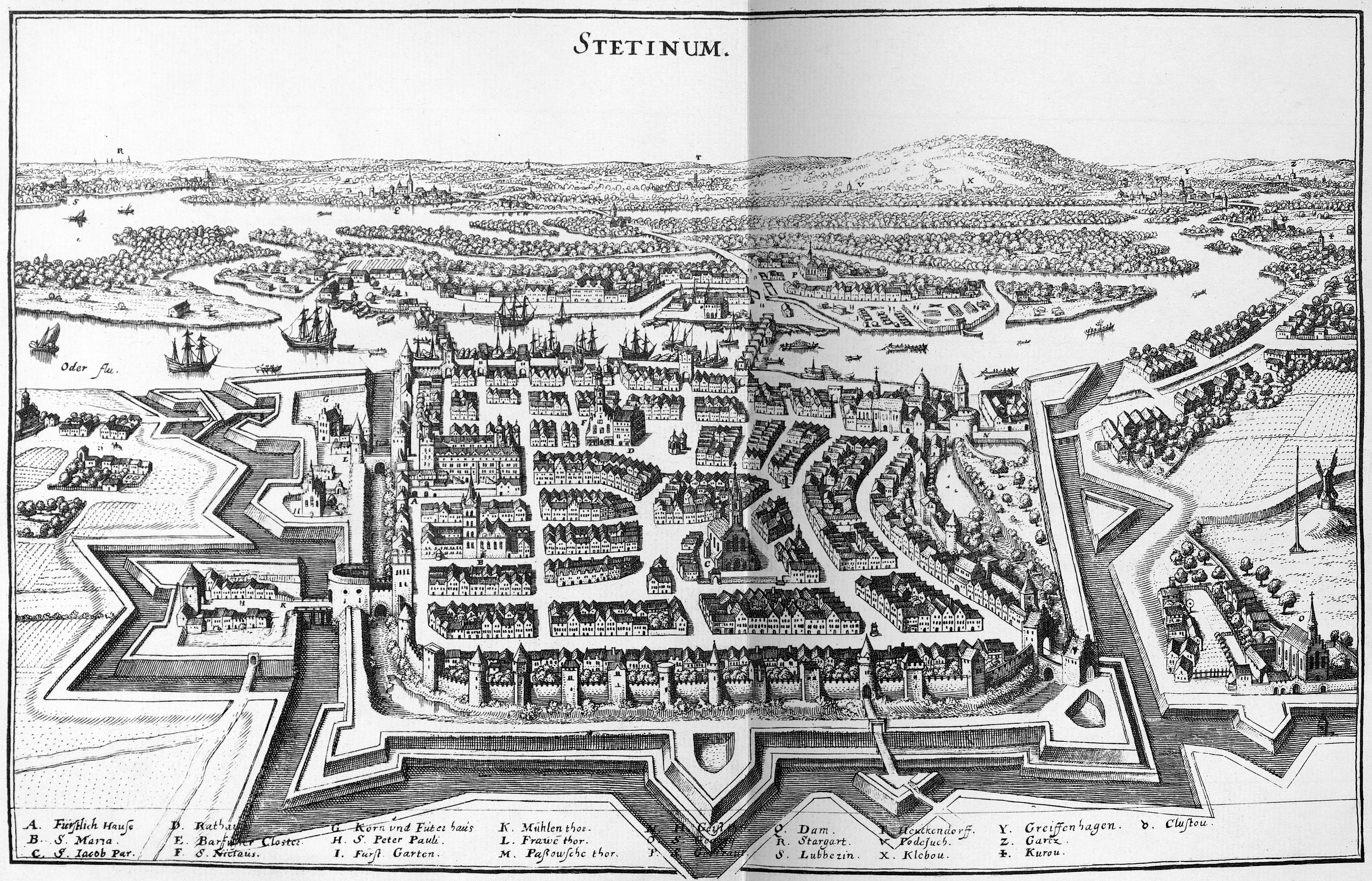
Stettin in 1642 showing the old fortress defenses

General-Major Karl Anton von Bila's cavalry brigade, which was acting as Hohenlohe's rear guard, became separated from the main body. Detecting Milhaud's brigade to his right, Bila veered north toward Strasburg. Turning east, he crossed the Uecker north of Pasewalk and reached Falkenwalde (now Tanowo) northwest of Stettin late on the 29th. There he found out about Hohenlohe's surrender and, more importantly, that Romberg was negotiating the capitulation of Stettin. One authority states that Romberg refused to allow Bila passage through Stettin. Reversing his course, Bila headed northwest and reached Anklam on the morning of 31 October. At this town, he met his brother, who left Hanover on 20 October with one battalion, the treasure, and the archives. The treasure was convoyed to Wolgast where it was ferried to safety. However, the amount of shipping was inadequate to save the troops and baggage that arrived at the port.

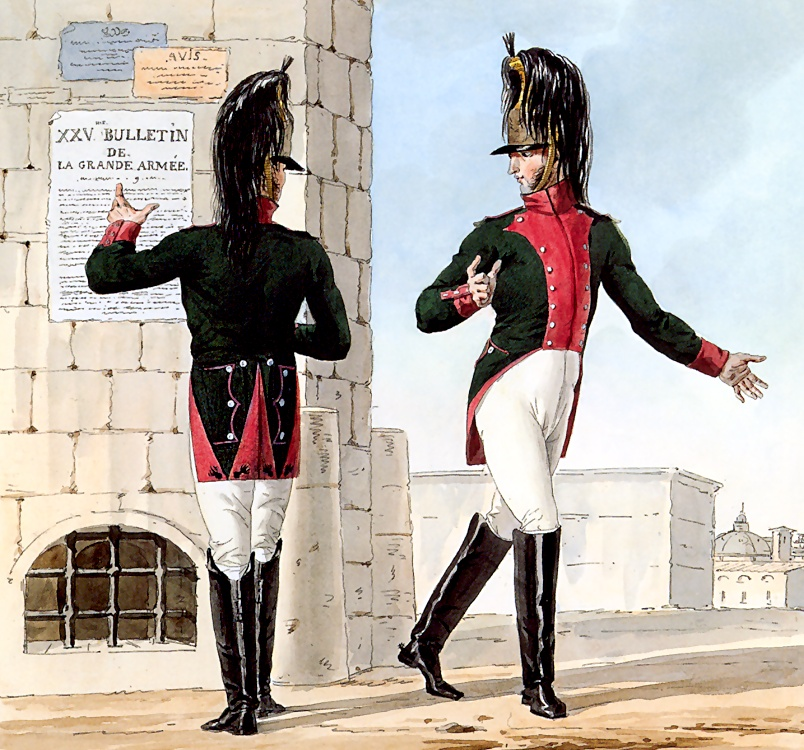
10th Dragoons, part of Grouchy's 2nd Dragoon Division

On the evening of the 31st, General of Division Nicolas Léonard Beker's dragoons located the Bila brothers near Anklam and attacked, driving them to the north bank of the Peene River. Beker talked the Bilas into surrendering on 1 November with 1,100 infantry, 1,073 cavalry, and six colors. The units involved were the 1st battalion of the Grävenitz Infantry Regiment Nr. 57, Sack Grenadier battalion, Quitzow Cuirassier Regiment Nr. 6, one squadron of Bailliodz Cuirassier Regiment Nr. 5, and the remnant of the Gensdarmes Cuirassiers. Historian Digby Smith wrote that Beker's brigade was from General of Division Louis Michel Antoine Sahuc's 4th Dragoon Division. Like Smith, Petre noted that Beker was the French commander, but states that on 1 November Sahuc's division was with Soult at Rathenow, far to the southwest. According to Petre, Beker temporarily took command of the 2nd Dragoon Division when Grouchy became ill earlier in the campaign. Petre's narrative strongly suggests that the 2nd Dragoon Division was involved, not the 4th.

Küstrin fortress fell on 1 November to General of Brigade Nicolas Hyacinthe Gautier's brigade of Davout's III Corps. The brigade, which belonged to General of Division Charles-Étienne Gudin de La Sablonnière's 3rd Division, included four battalions of the 25th and 8th Line Infantry Regiments. Oberst von Ingersleben commanded a garrison of 2,400 troops, including 75 troopers of Usedom Hussar Regiment Nr. 10 and the 3rd battalions of the Oranien Infantry Regiment Nr. 19, Zenge Infantry Regiment Nr. 24, and Prince Heinrich Infantry Regiment Nr. 35. Though he had 92 guns and ample stocks of food and ammunition, he quickly capitulated. Ingersleben was later sentenced to be executed for cowardice, but King Frederick William III commuted the sentence to life imprisonment.

On 2 and 3 November, the 22nd Dragoon Regiment from General of Brigade André Joseph Boussart's brigade arrived before Wolgast and secured the capitulation of Oberstleutnant von Prittwitz. A total of 2,500 men, mostly teamsters and non-combatants, and 500 wagons of Park Column Nr. 8 fell into the hands of this unit of Grouchy's 2nd Dragoon Division.

== Result ==
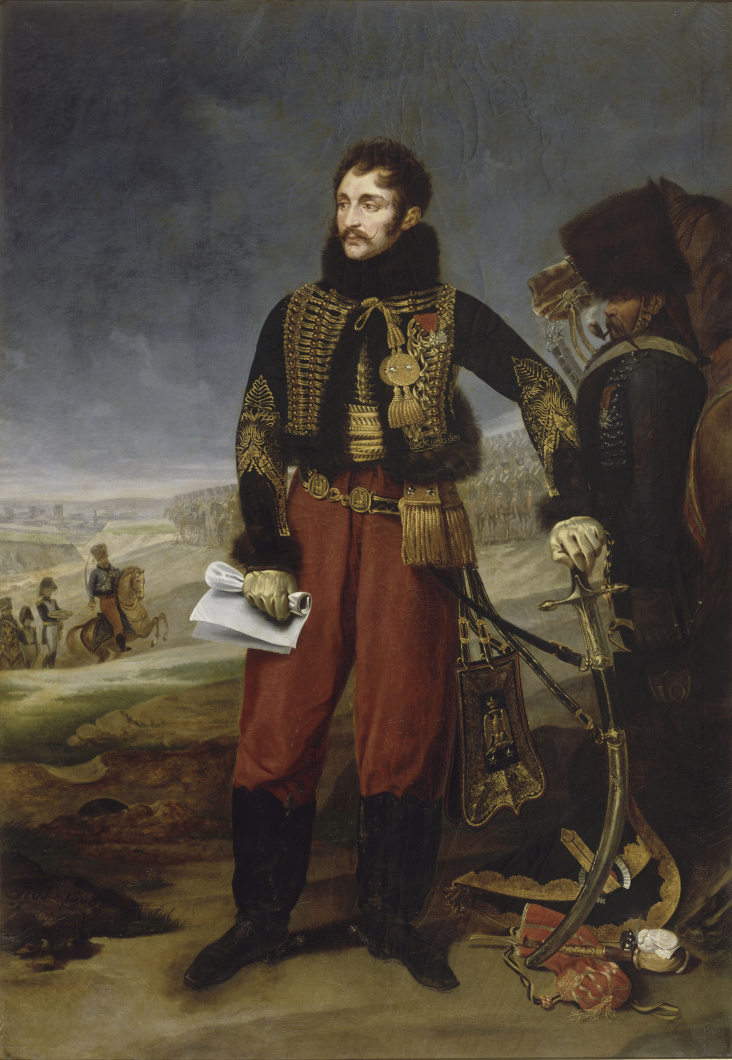
General Lasalle at the Siege of Stettin by Antoine-Jean Gros, 1808

By 3 November, between the Elbe and the Oder, the only remaining Prussian field army was led by Blücher and Lieutenant General Christian Ludwig von Winning, who relieved Saxe-Weimar. There also were garrisons at Magdeburg, Hameln, Nienburg, and Plassenburg. Winning desired to march for the port of Rostock and try to escape by sea. This notion was overruled by Blücher, who wanted to march the 21,000-man force east. He planned to join forces with Lieutenant General Karl Ludwig von Lecoq in Hanover or march on Magdeburg. Soult, Bernadotte, and Murat finally caught up to Blücher at the Battle of Lübeck on 6 November.

Antoine-Jean Gros produced a noted portrait General Lasalle at the Siege of Stettin which was exhibited at the Salon of 1808 at the Louvre.

== Notes ==
Preceded by Capitulation of Pasewalk	Napoleonic Wars; Capitulation of Stettin	Succeeded by Battle of Waren-Nossentin
