= Gijsbert =

- Gender: Male
- Language: Dutch

Origin
- Meaning: "bright pledge"
- Region of origin: Netherlands, Flanders

Other names
- Related names: Gijsbrecht, Gijs, Gilbert

Gijsbert is a Dutch masculine given name, which is a variant of the names Gisbert and Gilbert, and means "bright pledge". The name may refer to:

- Gijsbert Bos (born 1973), Dutch footballer
- Gijsbert Claesz van Campen (1580–1648), Dutch merchant
- Gijsbertus Craeyvanger (1810–1895), Dutch painter
- Gijsbert Haan (1801–1874), American religious leader
- Gijsbert Karel van Hogendorp (1762–1834), Dutch politician
- Gijsbert d'Hondecoeter (1604–1653), Dutch painter
- Gijsbert de Leve (1926–2009), Dutch mathematician
- Gijsbert van Tienhoven (1841–1914), Dutch politician and prime minister
- Gijsbert Verhoek (1644–1690), Dutch painter
- Gijsbert Voet (1589–1676), known as Gisbertus Voetius, Dutch Calvinist theologian

== See also ==
- Gijs
