= Capitulation of Pasewalk =

1806 surrender during the War of the Fourth Coalition

- Part of the War of the Fourth Coalition
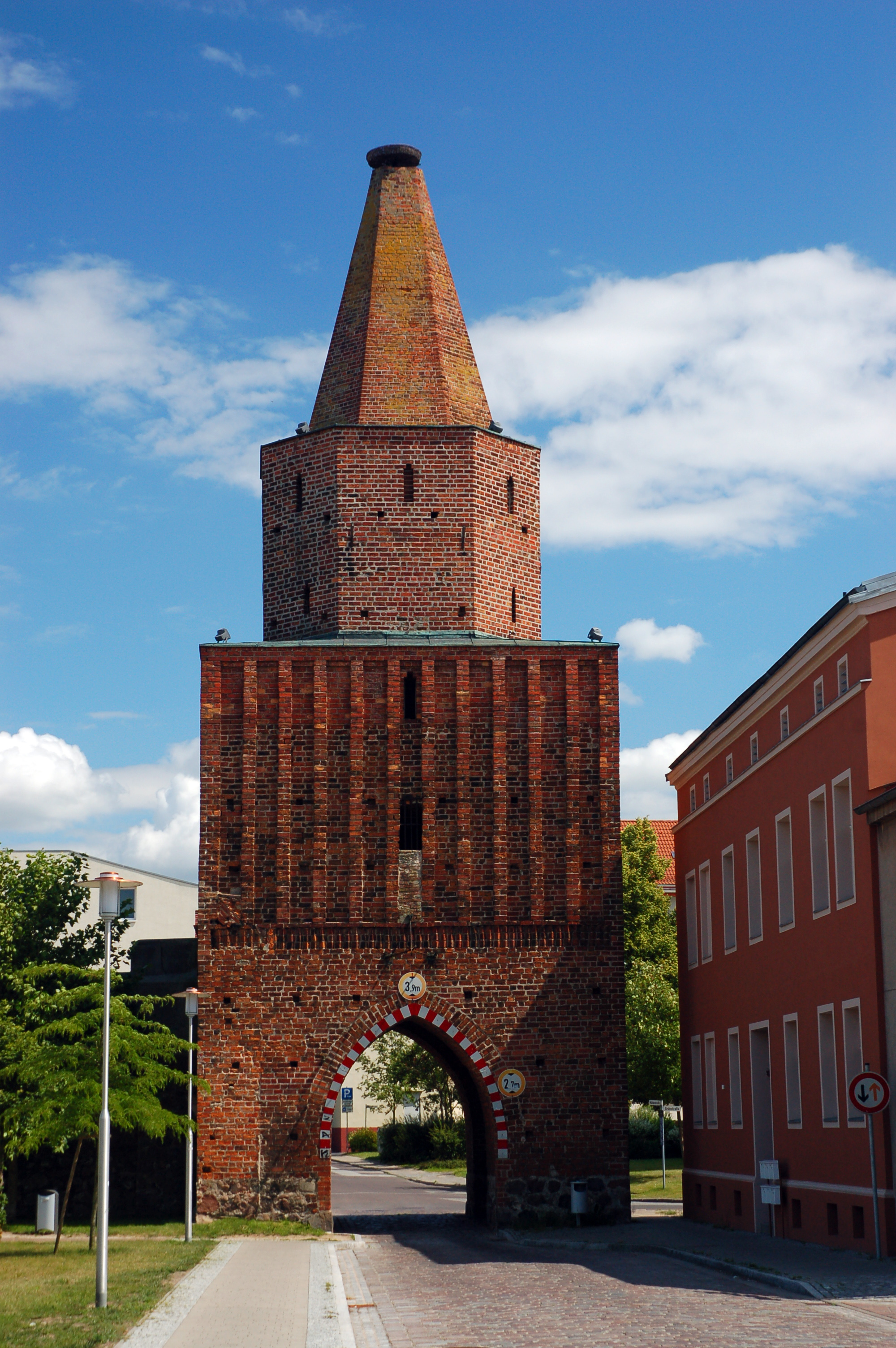
- The Pasewalk Mühlentor, an old city gate
Date	29 October 1806
Location	Pasewalk, Germany 53.5°N 14°E
Result	French victory

Belligerents
(France) French Empire	(Kingdom of Prussia) Prussia

Commanders and leaders
(France) Édouard Milhaud (France) Antoine Lasalle	(Kingdom of Prussia) Colonel von Hagen (surrendered)

Strength
700–1,500	4,200; 8 guns

Casualties and losses
None	4,200 soldiers captured, 8 guns captured, 37 colors captured

War of the Fourth Coalition
⬤ current battle
⬤ Napoleon not in command
⬤ Napoleon in command

The Capitulation of Pasewalk on 29 October 1806 resulted in the surrender of Oberst (Colonel) von Hagen's 4,200 Prussian soldiers to an inferior force of two French light cavalry brigades led by Generals of Brigade Édouard Jean Baptiste Milhaud and Antoine Lasalle. The Prussians were completely demoralized after a two-week-long retreat following their decisive defeat at the Battle of Jena-Auerstedt. Pasewalk is 110 kilometers north of Berlin and about 40 kilometers west of Szczecin (Stettin), Poland.

While retreating east toward Stettin on the Oder River, Hagen found his column trapped between Lasalle's brigade and Milhaud's brigade. Without attempting to break out, the baffled Prussian officer surrendered. The incident at Pasewalk came after a similar Prussian surrender after the Battle of Prenzlau the previous day. Within a week two fortresses would capitulate without firing a shot and a number of other Prussian columns would be hunted down one by one.

== Background ==
On 14 October 1806, the Grande Armée of Emperor Napoleon I of France decisively defeated the Prussians at the Battle of Jena-Auerstadt. At Jena Napoleon's 96,000 troops smashed the 53,000-man army of Generals of Infantry Frederick Louis, Prince of Hohenlohe-Ingelfingen and Ernst von Rüchel, while the 26,000-man III Corps of Marshal Louis-Nicolas Davout defeated Feldmarschall Charles William Ferdinand, Duke of Brunswick's 49,800-strong army at Auerstedt.

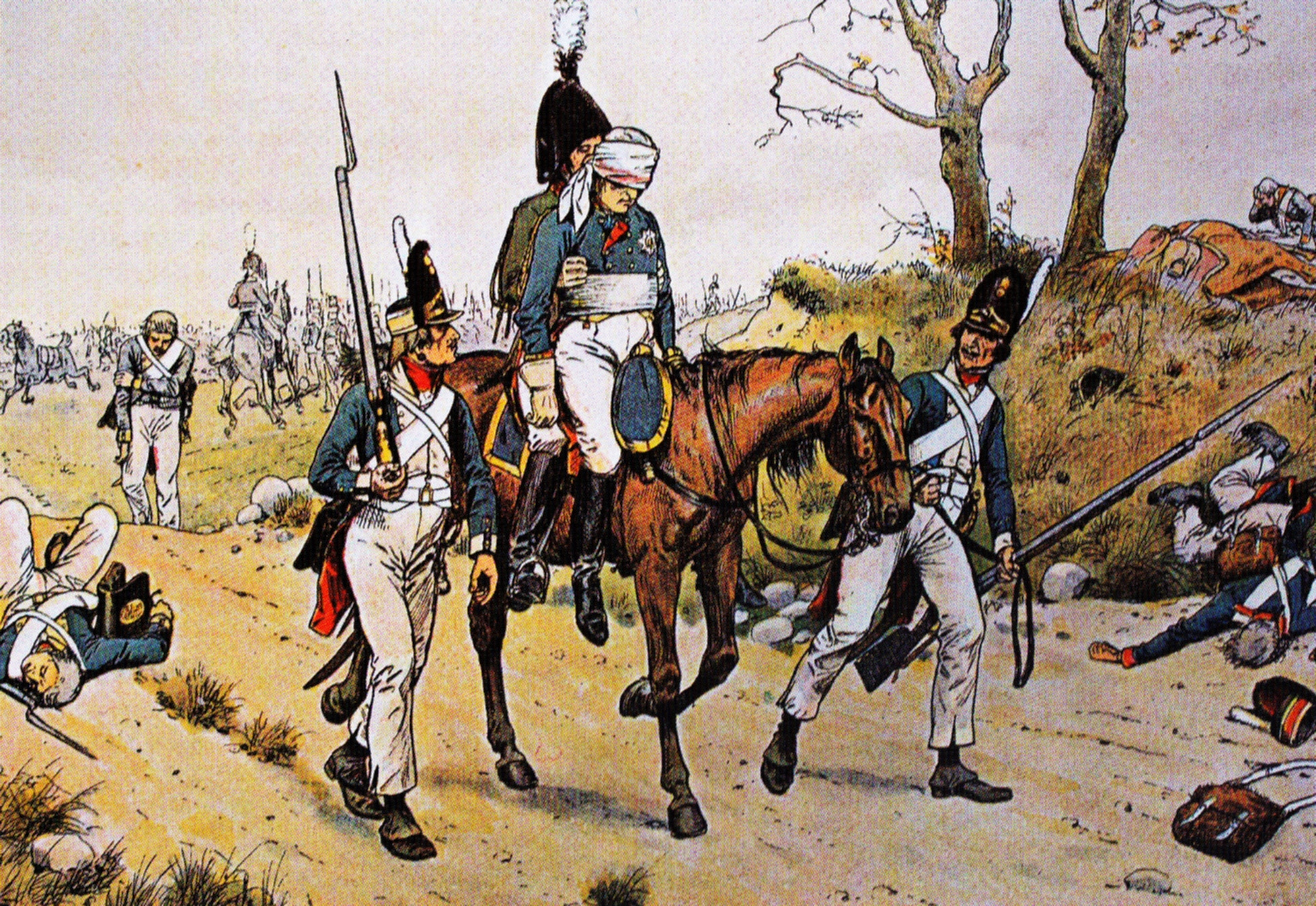
The Battle of Jena-Auerstedt smashed the Prussian armies, by Richard Knötel.

At Jena, French losses were 6,794 while Prussian losses were very large but impossible to calculate. The Saxons saved only 23 of their artillery pieces, while losing 59. The Prussians lost at least 24 guns plus 12 colors. Davout estimated his losses as 7,000 at Auerstedt while his enemies suffered 10,000 killed and wounded and 3,000 captured. The Prussians admitted losing 57 guns from their artillery batteries, not counting regimental guns. So Davout's claim to have captured 115 pieces may be accurate.

The Prussian army was so thoroughly shattered by its defeat that it had not recovered cohesion by the next day. Shot through both eyes, Brunswick expired at Altona on 10 November. The badly wounded Rüchel made his way to Poland where he recovered. The retreating mass of Prussians resolved itself into three columns under Prince Hohenlohe, Lieutenant General Gebhard von Blücher, and General of the Infantry Friedrich Adolf, Count von Kalckreuth. These forces marched through the Harz Mountains toward Halberstadt. Trailing behind was the 12,000-man corps of Lieutenant General Karl August, Grand Duke of Saxe-Weimar-Eisenach, which missed Jena-Auerstadt.

On 16 October, French cavalry under Marshal Joachim Murat secured the surrender of 12,000 men and 65 guns in the Capitulation of Erfurt. It was only the first of a series of craven Prussian surrenders. The following day, Marshal Jean-Baptiste Bernadotte drubbed Lieutenant General Eugene Frederick Henry, Duke of Württemberg's Reserve at the Battle of Halle, inflicting 5,000 casualties on this previously fresh body of troops for a French loss of only 800.

== Long retreat ==
The columns of Hohenlohe and Württemberg rendezvoused at Magdeburg on 20 October. Kalckreuth crossed the Elbe River at Tangermünde and joined his corps to Hohenlohe's soon afterward. He then left for an assignment in Poland. On the 20th, Soult and Murat were before Magdeburg. Murat demanded its surrender, which Hohenlohe refused. That day, Davout seized a bridgehead over the Elbe at Wittenberg and Lannes seized a second crossing at Dessau.

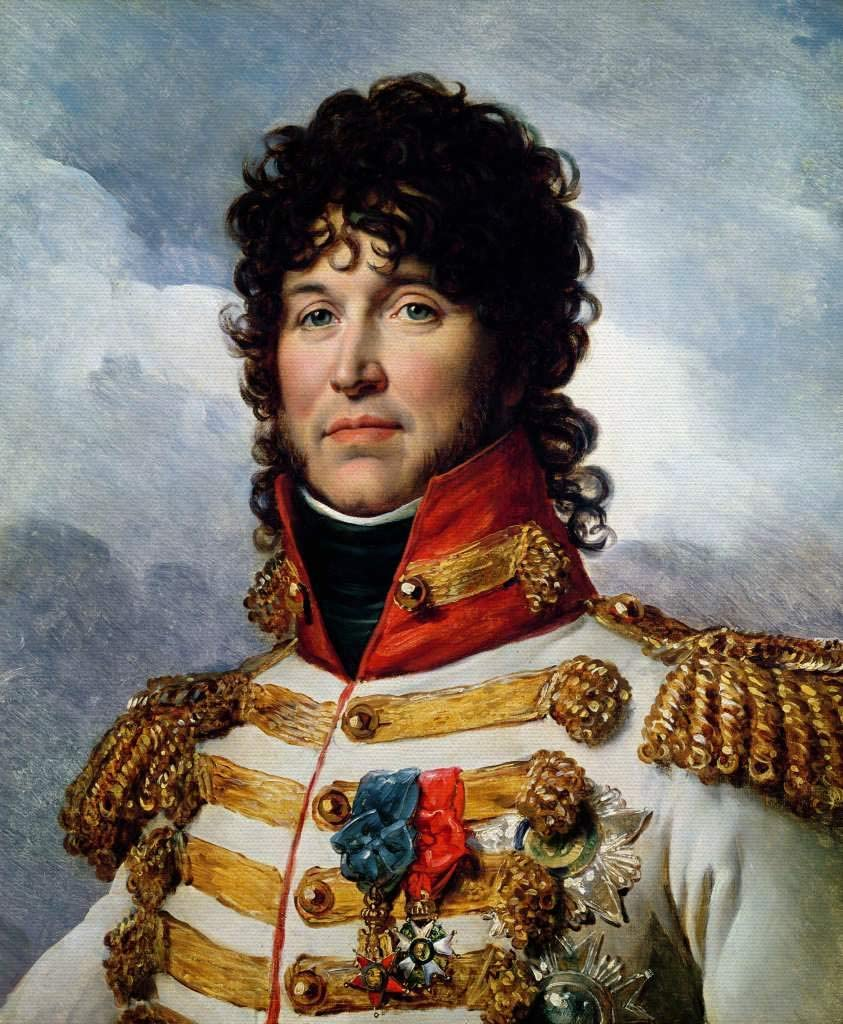
Joachim Murat

Having received orders from King Frederick William III of Prussia to march to the Oder River, Hohenlohe's army left Magdeburg on 21 October and reached Burg bei Magdeburg that night. He left 9,000 men to reinforce the garrison, so that, together with stragglers, there were 25,000 troops in the city. Hohenlohe reached Genthin at night on 22 October and Rathenow on the evening of the 23rd. To better feed his troops, he divided his command up into multiple columns.

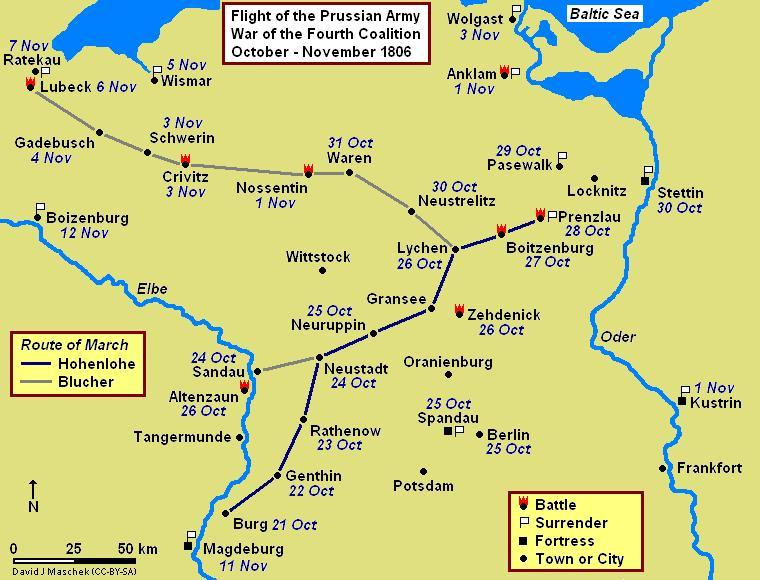
Prenzlau-Lübeck Campaign Map, October–November 1806

Leaving Marshal Michel Ney's VI Corps to begin the Siege of Magdeburg, Napoleon ordered his right wing to march east for Berlin. The French right wing consisted of Davout's corps, Marshal Jean Lannes' V Corps, Marshal Pierre Augereau's VII Corps, and four of Murat's cavalry units. These were the 1st Cuirassier Division led by General of Division Etienne Marie Antoine Champion de Nansouty, the 2nd Cuirassier Division under General of Division Jean-Joseph Ange d'Hautpoul, the 2nd Dragoon Division commanded by General of Division Emmanuel Grouchy, and the 3rd Dragoon Division under General of Division Marc Antoine de Beaumont. The left wing was made up of Bernadotte's corps, Marshal Nicolas Soult's IV Corps, and General of Division Louis Michel Antoine Sahuc's 4th Dragoon Division. Guarding the line of communications was General of Division Louis Klein's 1st Dragoon Division. Smith gives the cavalry division numbers.

Blücher crossed the Elbe at Sandau on 24 October, while Saxe-Weimar got across there two days later. On the 26th, Oberst Ludwig Yorck von Wartenburg held off Soult's advance guard at Altenzaun before safely crossing to the east bank. At this time Lieutenant General Johann Friedrich Winning relieved Saxe-Weimar in command. Hohenlohe marched to Neustadt an der Dosse on the 24th. His goal was the fortress of Szczecin (Stettin) on the Oder. To protect his right flank, he ordered General-Major Christian Ludwig Schimmelpfennig to move through Fehrbellin, between Neustadt and Oranienburg. Blücher took over the leadership of Hohenlohe's rear guard.

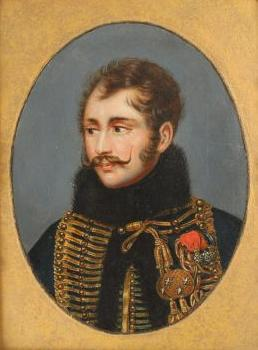
Antoine Lasalle

On 25 October Davout's corps marched through Berlin while one of Lannes' divisions captured the fortress of Spandau with 920 men and 71 cannons. Hohenlohe's main body arrived near Neuruppin that evening, with Blücher's rear guard division still at Neustadt. General von Schwerin's cavalry and Oberst von Hagen's infantry brigade bivouacked at Wittstock. General-Major Karl Anton von Bila's light brigade reached Kyritz north of Neustadt. Desiring to cut off the forces under Hohenlohe, Napoleon ordered Murat and Lannes to move north from Berlin. Immediately available at Oranienburg were the light cavalry brigades of Generals of Brigade Antoine Lasalle and Edouard Jean Baptiste Milhaud, plus Grouchy's dragoons.

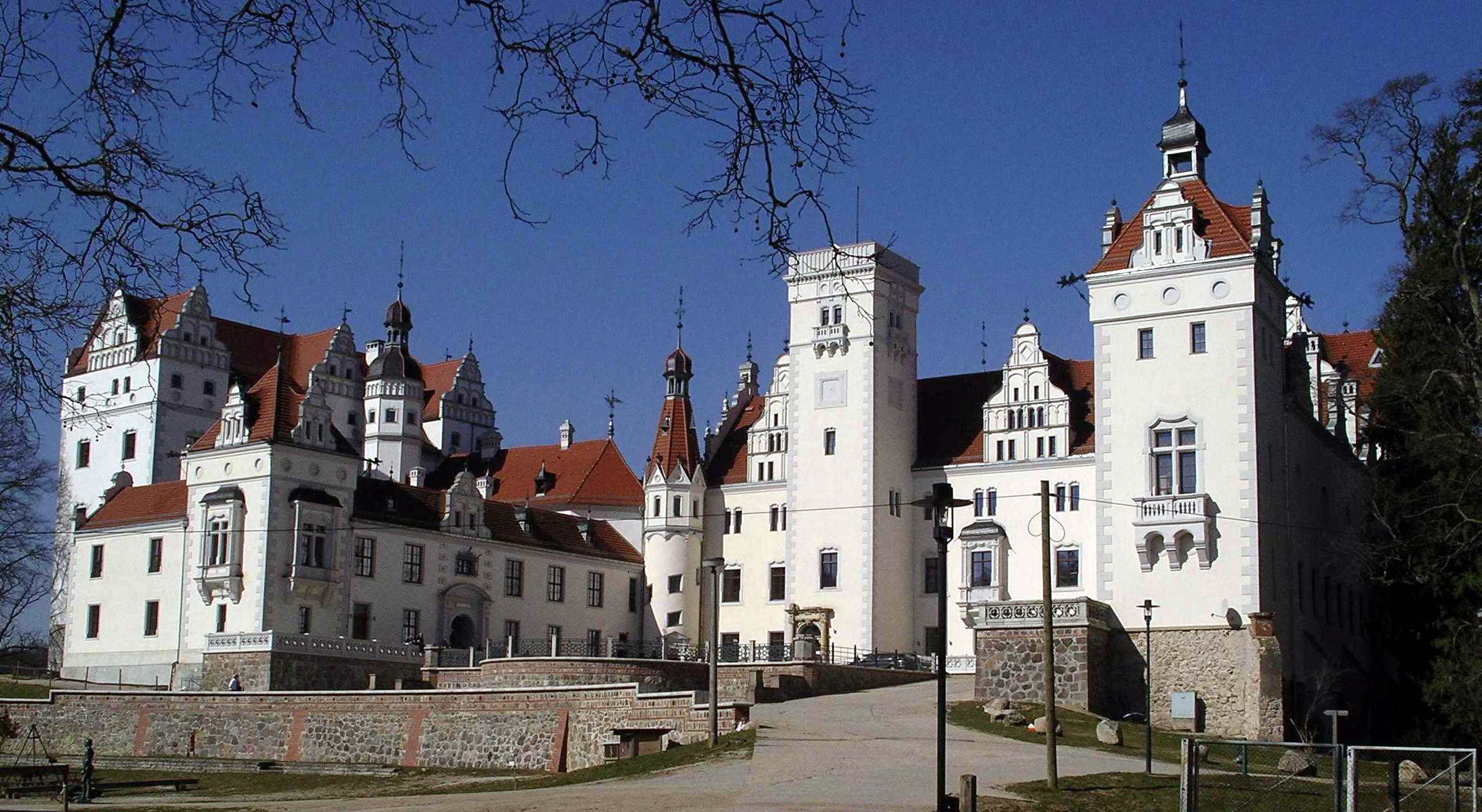
Schloss Boitzenburg where supplies were collected

On 26 October, Lasalle caught up with Schimmelpfennig at Zehdenick. Initially, the Prussians held their own, but when Grouchy's division charged into the fray, Schimmelpfennig's force scattered. The survivors fled to Stettin with Lasalle, Grouchy, and Beaumont in pursuit. The results of this clash compelled Hohenlohe to shift farther northeast from Gransee to Lychen. The next morning he waited in vain for Blücher and Bila to catch up before continuing toward the east. On 27 October, Milhaud's brigade reached Boitzenburg before Hohenlohe's advance guard. After a three-hour combat, the Prussians drove Milhaud's troopers off, but not before the French despoiled supplies collected for their hungry opponents at the Schloss Boitzenburg. Hearing the sounds of battle, Murat marched north with Grouchy's dragoons. At Wichmannsdorf, three French dragoon regiments got into a brawl with the Gensdarmes Cuirassier Regiment # 10. Murat wiped out the Prussian unit but Hohenlohe managed to slip past him toward Prenzlau.

At 4:00 AM on 28 October, Hohenlohe's exhausted Prussians stumbled into Schönermark-Nordwestuckermark eight kilometers west of Prenzlau. At a council of war it was determined to continue on into Prenzlau. At this time orders were sent to Hagen to make for Pasewalk. The Battle of Prenzlau occurred that day. Murat with Lasalle, Milhaud, Grouchy, Beaumont, and 3,000 of Lannes' infantry intercepted Hohenlohe's column as it marched into the city. Lasalle attacked in front, followed by the two dragoon divisions. On the outskirts, one of Grouchy's brigades hewed a path through the Prussian column, capturing many prisoners and isolating the rear guard. Beaumont's dragoons drove the rear guard against the Uecker River north of the city and forced Prince Augustus of Prussia to surrender. Though Hohenlohe still had a clear road to Stettin, Murat bluffed him into surrendering 10,000 troops by claiming he was surrounded by 100,000 Frenchmen.

== Capitulation ==
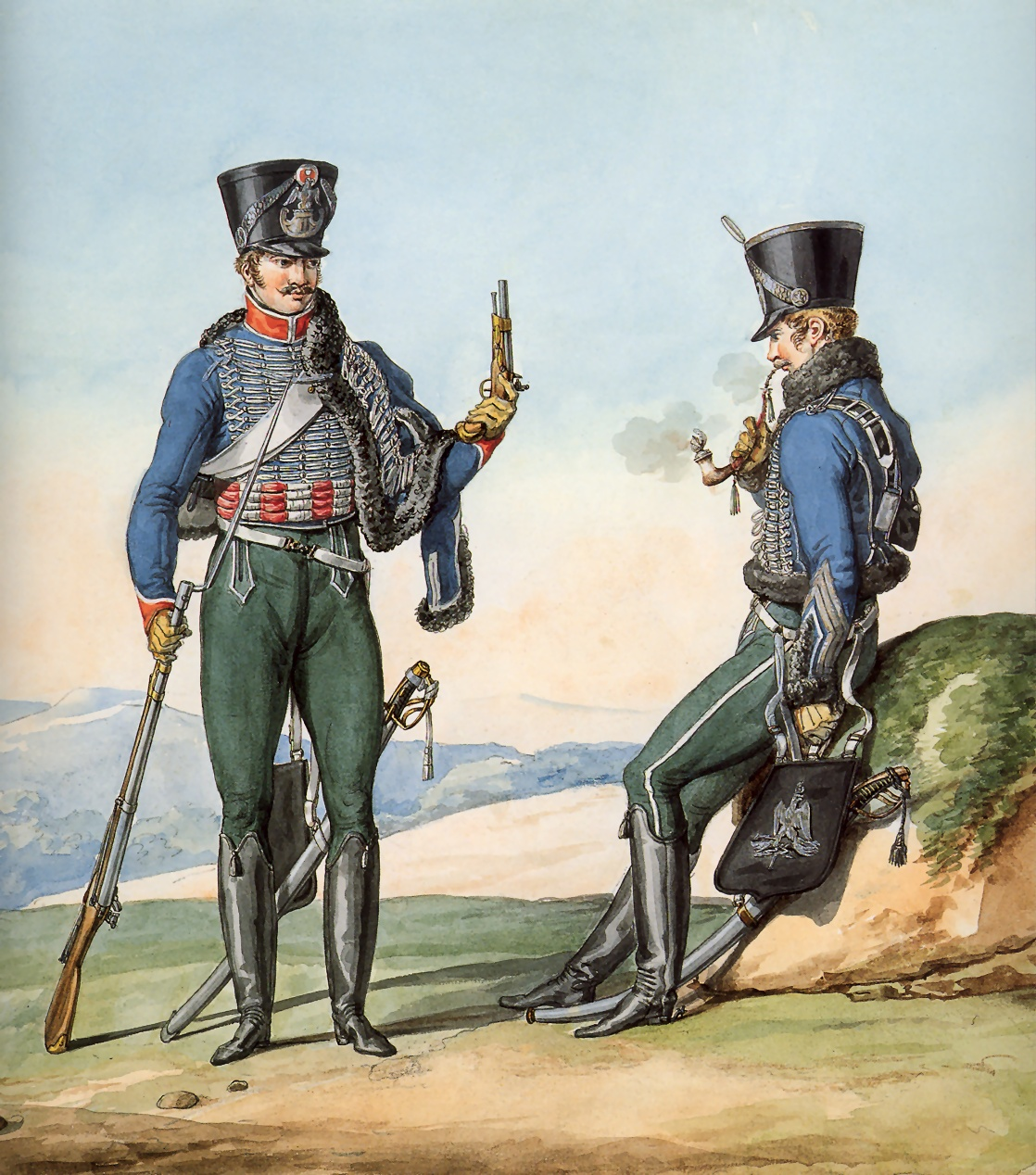
France: 1st Hussar Regiment

Moving on Murat's left flank on the 28th, Milhaud reached the village of Bandelow, about halfway between Prenzlau and Pasewalk. From there, he marched toward the sound of the guns from the Battle of Prenzlau. His brigade arrived in time to witness Prince Augustus' surrender to Beaumont. His troopers bivouacked that night in Bandelow and rode to Pasewalk the next morning. After Hohenlohe capitulated at Prenzlau, Lasalle rode northeast to Löcknitz on the Randow stream. At 4:00 PM, he arrived at the village, which was on the direct road between Pasewalk and Stettin. The French general deployed his cavalrymen in Löcknitz and in the hamlet of Bergholz facing northwest in the direction of Pasewalk.

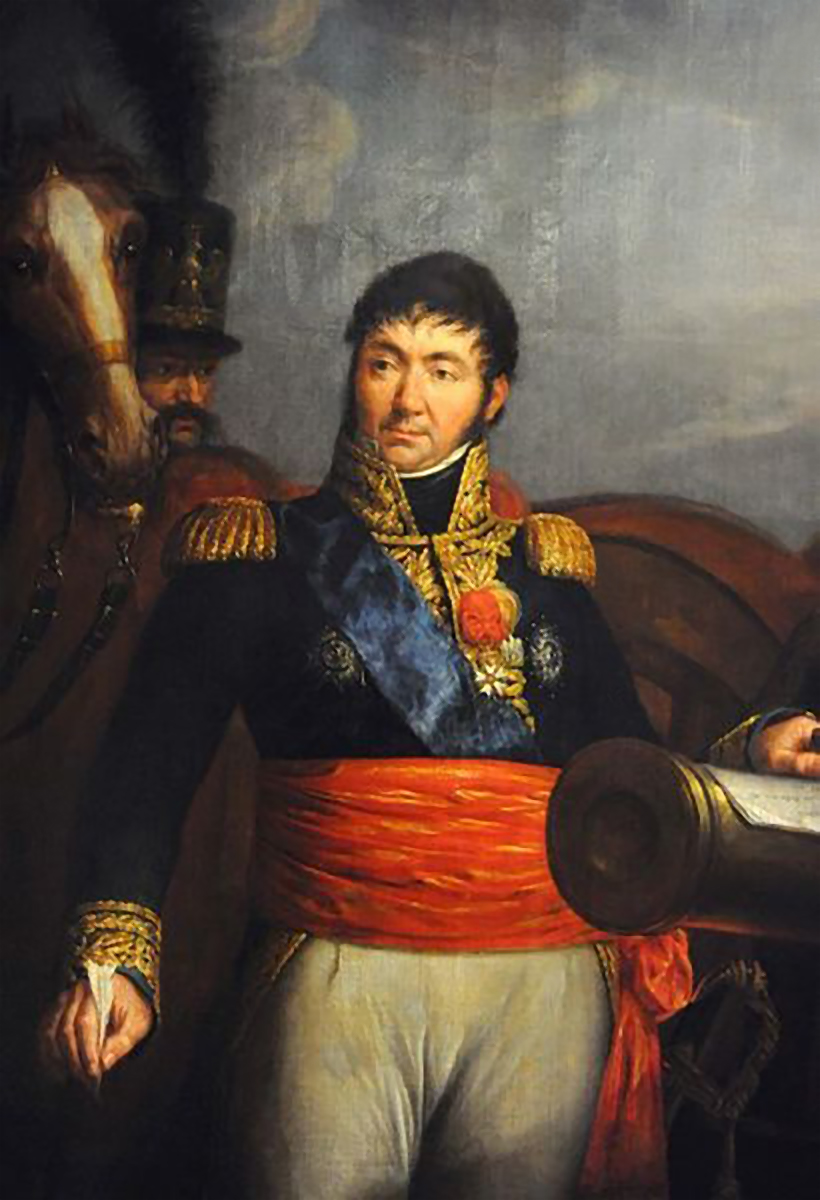
Édouard Milhaud

Appearing before the town, Milhaud sent an emissary to demand a surrender. The Prussian colonel, finding Milhaud behind him and Lasalle ahead of him, immediately capitulated with 185 officers, 4,043 rank and file, 2087 cavalry horses, one ammunition wagon, and eight artillery pieces. Hagen's force consisted of his own infantry brigade and Oberst von Podewil's cavalry brigade. The French captured colors (number in parentheses) from the Pirch Infantry Regiment # 22 (3), Zenge Infantry Regiment # 24 (3), Treuenfels Infantry Regiment # 29 (4), Prince Ferdinand Infantry Regiment # 34 (2), Henkel Cuirassier Regiment # 1 (5), Heising Cuirassier Regiment # 8 (5), Holtzendorff Cuirassier Regiment # 9 (5), Leib Carabinier Regiment # 11 (5), and Bünting Cuirassier Regiment # 12 (5).

The Prussian officers were released after giving their word of honor not to fight against France for the rest of the campaign. Milhaud's entire force consisted of the 1st Hussar Regiment and the 13th Chasseurs a Cheval, a total of 700 troopers. Lasalle's brigade included the 5th and 7th Hussar Regiments with 800 cavalrymen and two cannons. Another authority placed the 1st Hussars with General of Division Anne Jean Marie René Savary at Neuruppin on the 29th, and wrote that Milhaud led the 13th Chasseurs and an unnamed dragoon regiment.

Historian Digby Smith wrote that the Pasewalk incident showed the morale of the Prussian army to be extremely low at this point in the campaign. There was no fighting. Lannes wrote, "The Prussian army is in such a state of panic that the mere appearance of a Frenchman is enough to make it lay down its arms." That night, Lasalle achieved an even more astonishing coup in the Capitulation of Stettin. Between 30 October and 3 November, the French captured Küstrin fortress, an artillery convoy, Hohenlohe's baggage train and guard, and Bila's brigade. Blücher and Winning decided to head northwest for Lübeck with their 22,000 troops. The Battle of Lübeck was fought on 6 November.

== Notes ==
Preceded by Battle of Prenzlau	Napoleonic Wars; Capitulation of Pasewalk	Succeeded by Capitulation of Stettin
