= Joan Manuel Gisbert =

Spanish writer of children's literature (born 1949)

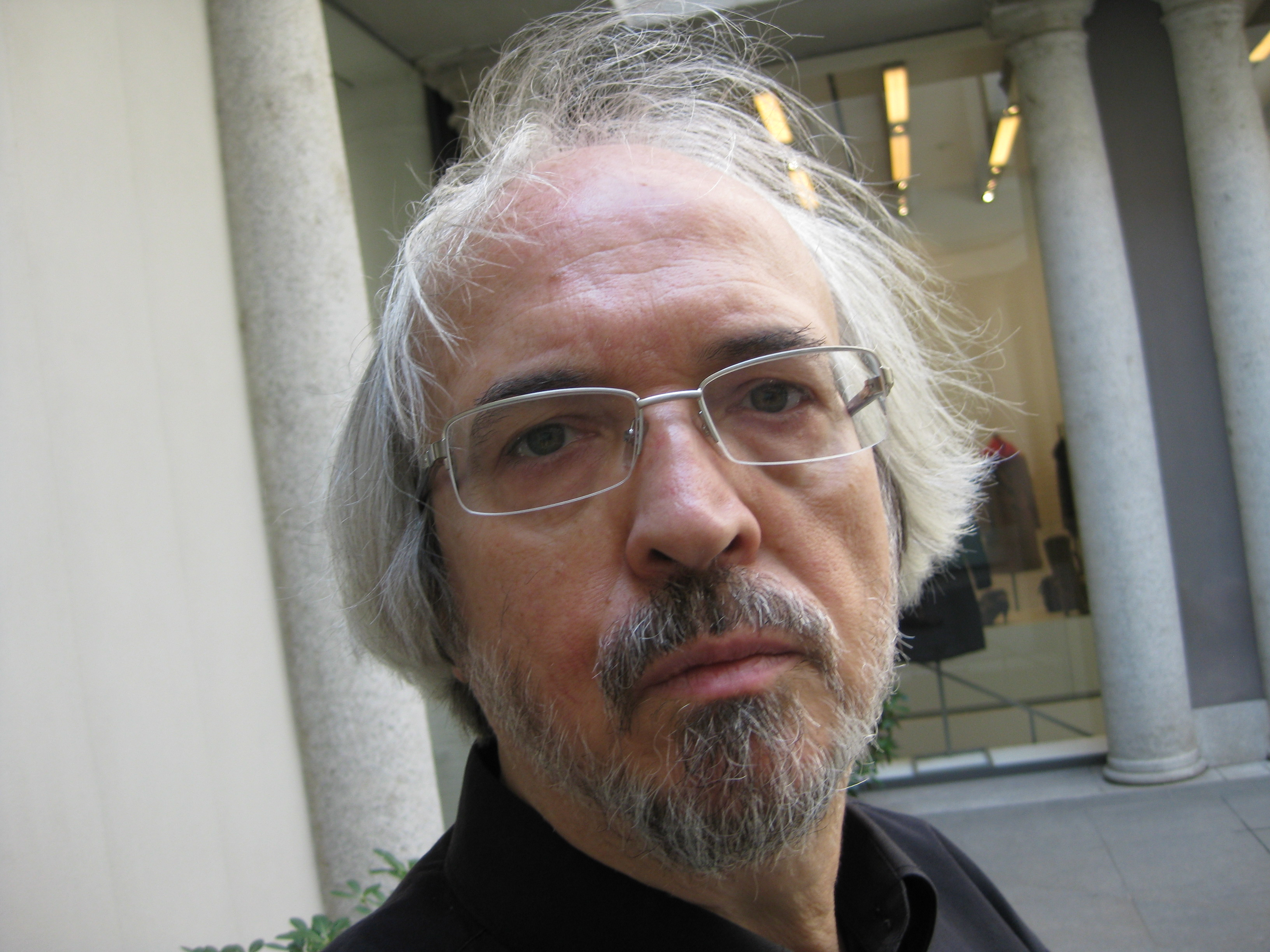
Joan Manuel Gisbert

Joan Manuel Gisbert (born 16 October 1949 in Barcelona) is a Spanish writer of children's literature. His books have been translated into ten languages.

Because of the untimely death of his father, he started to work early, working with different publishers. He travelled to Paris to study theatre and on his return he published his first book, Fantastic Scenarios (1979), which won the Award of the CCIS. A year later, his book The mystery of the Tökland island (1981) got the Lazarillo Award and figured in the Honor Roll Andersen Award. He was compared by the critics with authors like J. R. R. Tolkien and C. S. Lewis. His next work, Thamyris planet legends (1982) was declared in 1983 Children's Book of Interest by the Ministry of Culture. With The museum of dreams (1984) he won the National Book Award for Young People. For Night of the eclipse (1990) was awarded the prize Wide Angle. The voice of morning received the prize Edebé in 1995. He has also obtain the Barco de Vapor prize twice.

In his books, Gisbert develops adventures that depart from everyday life which are also part of dreams, to get into the unknown. Joan Manuel Gisbert also works as an editorial consultant, he teaches about fantastic imagination and he participates in meetings about children's literature. He has also made scripts for TV.
