= Friedrich Gisbert Wilhelm von Romberg =

German military officer (1729–1809

Friedrich Gisbert Wilhelm Freiherr von Romberg (17 July 1729 – 21 May 1809) was a German officer who rose to lieutenant general (Generalleutnant) in the Prussian Army. As governor of Stettin in 1806, he surrendered without a fight, for which he was sentenced to life imprisonment by a Prussian military tribunal.

== Life ==
From a Westphalian noble family, Romberg was born in his family castle in 1729. He started his career in the Prussian army by becoming a Gefreitenkorporal in Infanterieregiment Graf Wied (No. 41) in 1746. He was badly wounded at the Battle of Kolín in 1757. In 1773 he was put in command of a grenadier battalion and the following year he was made a member of the Pour le Mérite Order. In 1780 he was put in command of Infanterieregiment von Wolffersdorff (No. 9) under Karl Friedrich von Wolffersdorff – in the same year he was made an oberst.

In 1787 he became a major general and the following year he was put in command of Infanterieregiment No. 10. In 1792 he was made a member of the Order of the Red Eagle. He was promoted to lieutenant general in 1794 and made governor of Stettin in 1799. This was the capital of the Prussian province of Pomerania and intended as a position where Romberg would see little or no fighting. However, in 1806 the War of the Fourth Coalition broke out and on 14 October that year the Prussian Army was crushed by the French at the Battle of Jena. On 28 October the garrison of Prenzlau (a town to the southwest of Stettin) under Prince Hohenloe surrendered almost without a fight. French troops then arrived at Stettin and demanded its surrender and Romberg and his two subordinates (major general Kurd Gottlob von Knobelsdorff and major general Bonaventura von Rauch, commanders of the fortress and Fort Preusse respectively) decided to do so without a fight, thinking the French force was far larger than it was – in fact it consisted of only two hussar regiments under Antoine Lasalle, who accepted the surrender on 30 October. A Prussian military tribunal sentenced Romberg to life imprisonment for the surrender but ill health meant he was unable to take up his sentence and he died less than three years later in Berlin.

== Bibliography ==
- Hans Krause: "Fleht zum Herrn, in schweren Plagen, seufzt das arme Vaterland." Neue (alte) Dokumente aus der Franzosenzeit Stettins. In: Stettiner Bürgerbrief. Nr. 31, 2005, ISSN 1619-6201, S. 18–27.
- Martin Wehrmann: Geschichte der Stadt Stettin. Leon Sauniers Buchhandlung, Stettin 1911, S. 412–418. (Nachdruck: Weltbild Verlag, Augsburg 1993, ISBN 3-89350-119-3)
