= Gijs =

- Gender: Male
- Language: Dutch

Origin
- Meaning: "pledge", "hostage"
- Region of origin: Netherlands, Flanders

Other names
- Related names: Gijsbrecht, Gijsbert

Gijs is a Dutch masculine given name, which is a variant of Gijsbert, derived from the German name Gisbert. The Gis element is derived from gisil, meaning "pledge" or "hostage". The name may refer to:

- Gijs van Aardenne (1930–1995), Dutch politician
- Gijs Bakker (born 1942), Dutch jewelry designer
- Gijs Blom (born 1997), Dutch actor
- Gijs Bosch Reitz (1860-1938), Dutch painter
- Gijs Damen (born 1979), Dutch swimmer
- Gijs van Hall (1904–1977), Dutch politician
- Gijs Van Hoecke (born 1991), Belgian cyclist
- Gijs van Heumen (born 1952), Dutch field hockey player
- Gijs IJlander (born 1947), Dutch writer
- Gijs Kuenen (born 1940), Dutch microbiologist
- Gijs van der Leden (born 1967), Dutch water polo player
- Gijs van Lennep (born 1942), Dutch esquire
- Gijs Luirink (born 1983), Dutch footballer
- Gijs Ronnes (born 1977), Dutch volleyball player
- Gijs Scholten van Aschat (born 1959), Dutch actor
- Gijs Steinmann (born 1961), Dutch footballer
- Gijs Vermeulen (born 1981), Dutch rower

== See also ==
- Gijsbert
