= Antoine Charles Louis de Lasalle =

French cavalry general (1775–1809)

Antoine-Charles-Louis, Comte de Lasalle
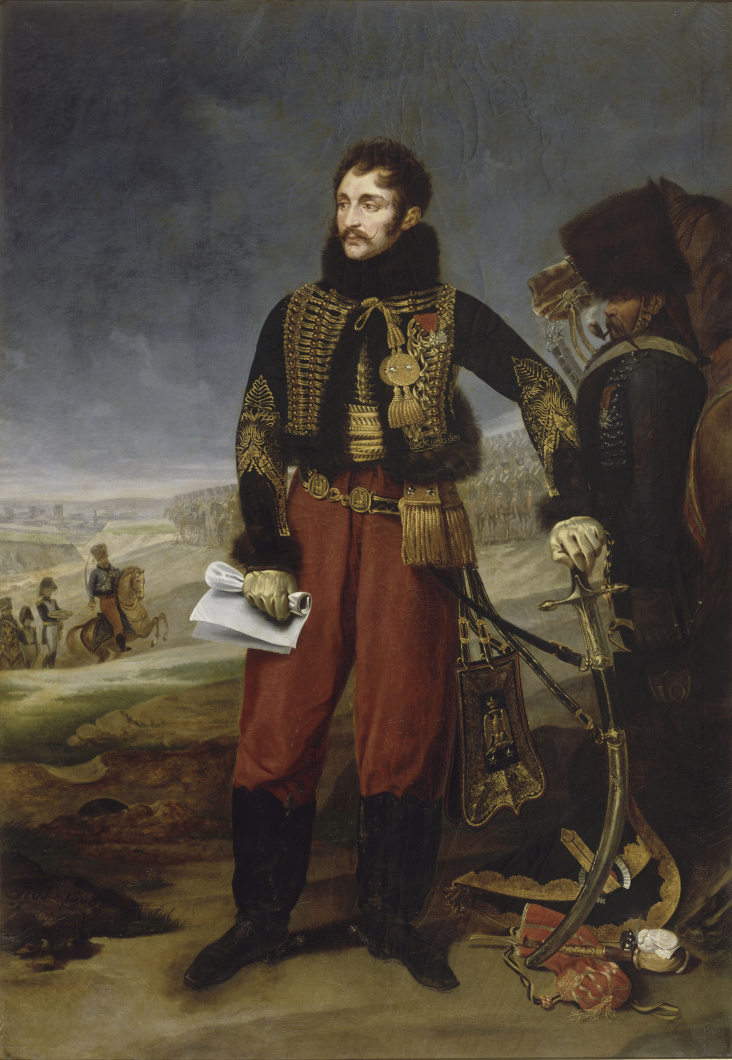
- General Lasalle at the Siege of Stettin by Antoine-Jean Gros, 1808
- Nickname: The Hussar General
- Born: 10 May 1775; Metz, Kingdom of France
- Died: 6 July 1809 (aged 34) Deutsch-Wagram, Austrian Empire
- Cause of death: Gunshot Wound (Killed in action)
- Allegiance: French First Republic; First French Empire
- Branch: French Army
- Service years: 1786–1809
- Rank: General de division
- Conflicts: See battles: French Revolutionary Wars; Italian campaign; Battle of Rivoli; French invasion of Egypt and Syria; Battle of the Pyramids; Napoleonic Wars; War of the Third Coalition; Battle of Austerlitz; War of the Fourth Coalition; Battle of Schleiz; Battle of Jena–Auerstedt; Battle of Prenzlau; Capitulation of Stettin; Battle of Lübeck; Battle of Golymin; Battle of Heilsberg; Peninsular War; Battle of Medina de Rioseco; Battle of Gamonal; Battle of Medellín; War of the Fifth Coalition; Battle of Aspern–Essling; Battle of Wagram †
- Awards: Count of the Empire; Order of the Iron Crown See: § Posthumous honours
- Spouse: Joséphine Berthier (m. 1803)
- Children: 1

Antoine-Charles-Louis, Comte de Lasalle (French pronunciation: [ɑ̃twan ʃaʁl lwi kɔ̃t də lasal]; 10 May 1775 – 6 July 1809) was a French cavalry general during the French Revolutionary and Napoleonic Wars. Often called "The Hussar General," he first gained fame for his role in the Capitulation of Stettin. Throughout his short career, he became known as a daring adventurer and was credited with many exploits, fighting on every front. He was killed at the Battle of Wagram.

== Early career ==
Antoine Lasalle was born on 10 May 1775 in Metz, Lorraine province, into a family of minor nobility. His father was Pierre Nicolas de Lasalle d’Augny, an officer in the French Royal Army and a knight of the Order of Saint Louis. His mother was Suzanne Dupuy de la Gaule, a descendant of Abraham de Fabert, a Marshal of France. His military inclinations showed at an early age and, thanks to his family's status, when he was just eleven years old he joined the Foreign Infantry Regiment of Alsace (France) as a second lieutenant replacement, thereafter rising to the rank of second lieutenant by the age of fourteen.

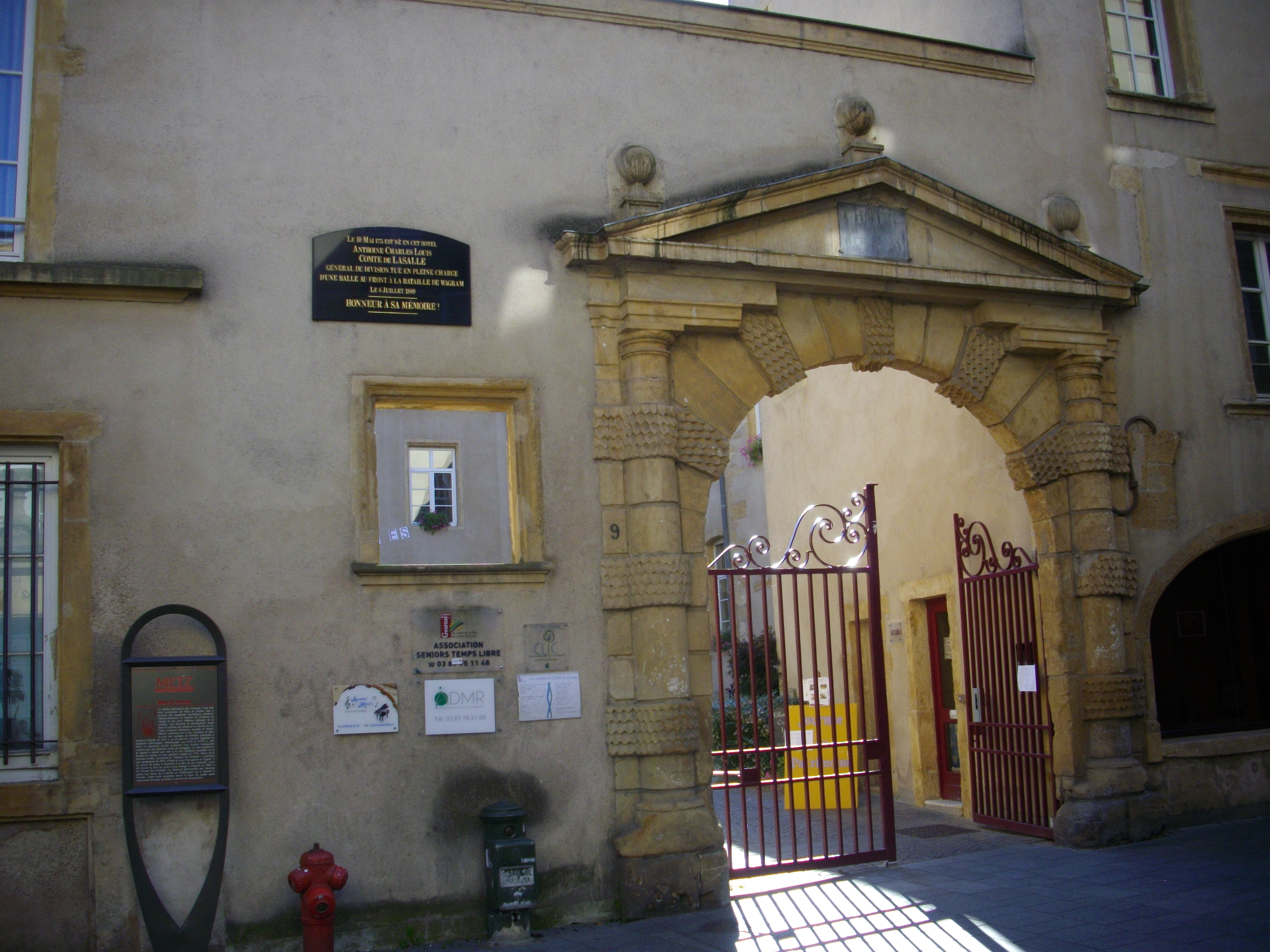
Entrance of Lasalle's birth house in Metz

When the French Revolution broke out, Lasalle embraced it and was assigned as a second lieutenant to the 24th Cavalry Regiment on 25 May 1791. Being an officer in the French Army had always been a privilege of the nobility, but this was reversed by a government decree in 1792, to the point of forbidding people of aristocratic origins to have military command. As a result, he lost his commission but he remained loyal to France. The incident did not deter his desire for a military career, so in 1792 he enlisted as a private and moved to Paris.

He joined the Section des Piques, a group of radical Parisian revolutionaries in the National Guard. By 1793, he had joined the Army of the North in Italy as a volunteer in the 23rd Horse Chasseur Regiment.

== The Army of Italy ==
Through family friendship with François Christophe Kellermann, he won back his pre-Revolutionary rank of lieutenant and became Kellermann's aide-de-camp on 10 March 1795. Enjoying the challenges of staff work, he stayed with Kellermann when he transferred to the Army of Italy on 6 May 1795. He was employed as an assistant to Kellermann's son, Adjutant-General François Étienne de Kellermann in May 1796. Lasalle was soon promoted to captain on 7 November of the same year.

=== Battle of Rivoli ===
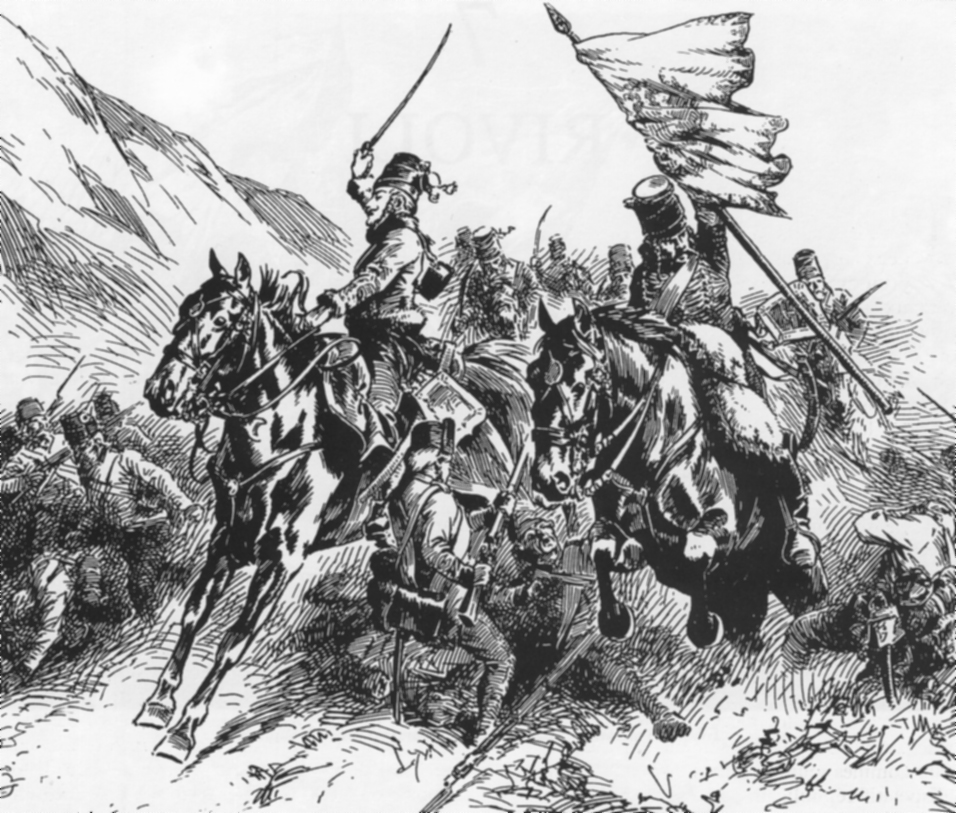
"Chef d'escadron" Lasalle at the battle of Rivoli

He justified his rapid progress and reputation when, at Rivoli, he spurred ahead with his entire cavalry—26 horsemen of the 22nd Horse Chasseurs. A battery of 15 French guns blasted the Austrian dragoons, while two columns of infantry were led forward, supported by cavalry under Leclerc and Lasalle. The packed Austrian soldiers in the gorge fled when their dragoons began trampling on them. As a result, an entire battalion of the Deutschmeister Regiment threw down its arms in panic and fled. Likewise, the dispersed infantry on the Trambasore Heights were unable to hold once Lasalle and the French cavalry got in their midst. Lasalle and his men continued to support Generals Lebley and Vial until the battle was over.

There were 5,000 French casualties against 14,000 on the Austrian side. Eleven flags were captured, five of those by Lasalle. After the battle, all of the trophies were piled up before Napoleon. Lasalle lay exhausted a few feet away on top of his five flags. Napoleon said, "Go to sleep on your flags, Lasalle, for it was well-deserved!"

== The invasion of Egypt ==
Napoleon Bonaparte personally asked Lasalle to participate in the Campaign in Egypt. Excited about participating in this expedition, he joined the Army of the East. They invaded Alexandria and from there marched to Cairo. On 21 July 1798, at the Battle of the Pyramids, the Turks, reassured by the easy refuge the village of Embabeh provided for them, resisted the efforts of the French Army. Lasalle, at the head of 60 men, charged the village and routed the garrison. He cut off the retreating army by taking a secret route through the Giza pyramid complex, allowing Napoleon to crush his opponents. Because of this bold move, Napoleon promoted Lasalle to Lieutenant Colonel of the 22nd Horse Chasseur Brigade and 7th Hussars.

== Interlude in France ==
=== Affair and marriage ===
Lasalle had been intimately connected with Joséphine Berthier, the wife of General Victor Leopold Berthier (Minister of War and Chief of Staff) and sister-in-law to Marshal Louis-Alexandre Berthier. Joséphine and Berthier divorced and Lasalle immediately proposed to her.

Napoleon gave Lasalle 200,000 francs towards the nuptials. When they met at the Tuileries Palace, Napoleon asked, "When is the wedding?" Lasalle replied, "Sire, when I have enough money to buy the wedding presents and furniture". Napoleon said, "But I gave you 200,000 francs last week, what did you do with them?". Lasalle replied, "I used half to pay my debts and have lost the rest gambling". Such a confession would have broken the career of any other soldier but, coming from Lasalle, it made the Emperor smile. Napoleon merely ordered his Grand Marshal of the Palace, and aide, General Géraud Duroc to give Lasalle another 200,000 francs. When a prefect asked why Napoleon didn't discipline Lasalle for his conduct, Napoleon responded "It only takes a stroke of a pen to create a prefect, but it takes twenty years to make a Lasalle".

== On the Prussian Front ==
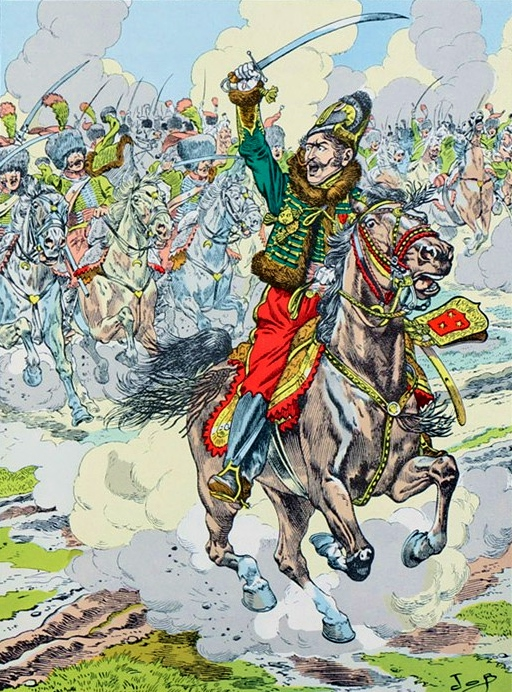
General Lasalle at the battle of Prenzlau

Lasalle went into immediate action at the Battle of Austerlitz, with the 1st Dragoon Division, under the command of Divisional General Louis Klein, in the Cavalry Reserve of Marshal Joachim Murat. Because of his successes on the field, he was given command of a Light Cavalry Brigade consisting of the 5th and 7th Hussar Regiments, also under the command of Marshal Murat. Lasalle's star was high during the 1806 campaign for Prussia, where his hussars became known as the "Brigade Infernale" ("Hellish Brigade"), with Colonels François Xavier de Schwarz and Ferdinand-Daniel Marx as his regimental commanders.

He then fought at Schleiz and Jena-Auerstedt, where he captured the King of Prussia's bodyguard and forced the Prince of Hohenlohe to retreat. On 26 October 1806, Lasalle was in pursuit of Hohenlohe when he observed Prussian infantry northwest of his position, at the edge of the forest, near Zehdenick. Unconcerned about the enemy's huge numerical superiority, he charged. After fierce fighting, the Prussians managed to beat back Lasalle's hussars until cavalry reinforcements arrived. General Grouchy arrived at about the same time and the combined attacks destroyed the Prussian cavalry. The Prussian infantry moved into the woods and then withdrew.

On 28 October, as they approached Prenzlau, they realized the Prussian Army had been inside the city for some time. Marshal Murat arrived at 10 a.m. and ordered Lasalle to cut the road from Gustow and to storm the northern gates of the city. Lasalle took his troopers right up to the city gates and burst them open. He continued through the city and out the east gates where he could see Hohenlohe's army forming in a plain northeast of the city.

=== Capitulation of Stettin ===
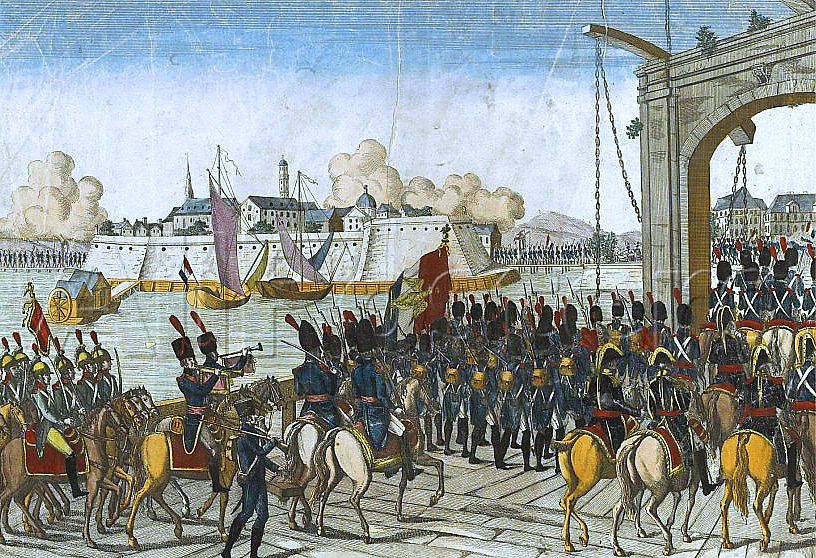
Capitulation of Stettin (anonymous print)

The next day Lasalle and his hussars marched to the fortress of Stettin, arriving well ahead of the main French force. He prepared to attack but decided to try a bluff instead. Pretending that the entire army had arrived, he demanded that Stettin surrender. General Romberg's reply was predictable: "Tell your master that the town of Stettin was entrusted to my safeguard and that I shall defend it to my last man". Lasalle then resorted to threats: "If, by 8 a.m. you have not surrendered, the town will be bombarded by our artillery, stormed by 50,000 men, the garrison will be put to the sword and the town will be plundered during twenty-four hours". Convinced that he was faced with 50,000 French soldiers, Romberg entered into negotiations and capitulated on the evening of 29–30 October.

=== Battles of Lübeck and Golymin ===
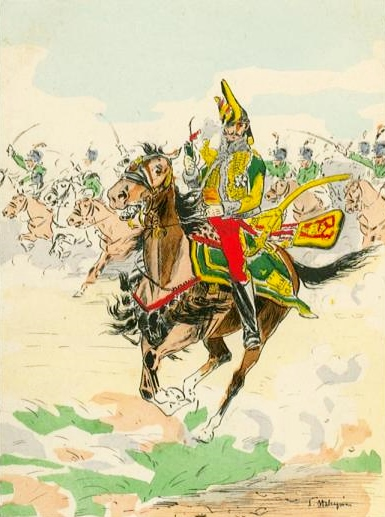
General Lasalle leading a cavalry charge

The capitulation of Stettin had prevented Prussian General Blücher from passing the frontier into Eastern Pomerania. Now Blücher was determined to escape from the French at any cost. Murat, together with Lasalle, Bernadotte and Soult were in hot pursuit, forcing Blücher farther and farther to the north. Having run out of Prussian territory, On 5 November, he marched into the neutral city-state of Lübeck, where he demanded money and food from the city authorities. The next day, Bernadotte's men arrived and attacked the walls. Lasalle was among these men and fought bravely.

During the Battle of Golymin, General Lasalle led his legendary "Hellish Brigade" against a Russian battery of 12-15 guns. The hussars charged with vigour but were abruptly seized with panic, turned about and, in disorder, stampeded back to the rear. Of the whole brigade only the elite company of the 7th Hussars, placed immediately behind Lasalle himself, remained firmly at their posts. Lasalle was furious. He rode after them, screamed "Halt!", and brought them back. Lasalle kept them within a short range from the Russian guns as punishment for their behaviour, standing 20 paces in front of his men, remaining motionless and calm, although under enemy fire.

He then finally rallied his troops and commanded "Break the ranks!", and with the support of Klein's dragoon division charged the enemy from the flank. The Russians were routed and fled under the cover of artillery as Lasalle pursued until the battle was won.

=== Promotion and cavalry trainer ===
On 30 December 1806, Lasalle was promoted to Divisional General and given command of the Light Cavalry Division in Murat's Cavalry Reserve. Shortly thereafter, Napoleon authorized raising a guard regiment of Polish Light Horse. Under General Lasalle they were given an intensive course in horsemanship and discipline, becoming one of the finest regiments in the Imperial Guard. An officer of the Poles wrote: "It was in Lasalle's school that we learned outpost duty. We have kept a precious memory of this general in whom all the lovable and imposing qualities of a born marshal were combined ... He should have replaced Murat to whom he was vastly superior ..."

=== Battle of Heilsberg ===
During the Battle of Heilsberg, on 12 June 1807, Murat was surrounded at the height of a mêlée by 12 Russian dragoons. Lasalle was in command of three brigades of light cavalry which contained the "Hellish Brigade", two lancer regiments, and five horse chasseur regiments. Lasalle saw Murat in trouble and charged at the enemy, killing the officer who commanded the detachment and putting 11 dragoons on the run, saving Murat's life. Shortly after, Murat and other members of the "Hellish Brigade" saved Lasalle from certain death. Afterwards, while shaking hands, Murat told Lasalle, "General, we are even". The following July, Napoleon made Lasalle a Grand Cross Knight of the Order of the Iron Crown. He was then sent to Spain under the orders of Jean-Baptiste Bessières.

== The Peninsular War ==
Lasalle was given command of the 1st Light Cavalry Division, consisting of the 8th Hussars, 13th, 16th and 24th Chasseurs. Lasalle's cousin, Pierre-Louis-Adolphe-Georges du Prel, became his aide-de-camp. He arrived in Spain on 15 February 1808. One of Lasalle's major faults was his willingness to repay resistance with brutality, which motivated the Spanish to continue brutal guerrilla warfare against French troops. In June, Lasalle was responsible for the torching of Torquemada, a village that resisted his troops. As his men approached Palencia, the insurgents abandoned their positions and fled to Valladolid, supported by a column of infantry.

=== Battling across Spain ===
After plundering Torquemada and ransoming the town of Palencia, Lasalle set off for Valladolid. On 11 June 1808 Lasalle's army linked up with the troops of General Merle. The following day, their combined 9,000-strong army attacked a force of 4-5,000 men under Spanish General Cuesta, deployed along the Cabezón bridge to bar the road to Burgos against oncoming French divisions. In the subsequent French attack, the Spanish cavalry fled and the infantry broke, whereafter Lasalle proceeded to Valladolid, which he occupied the same night.

On 14 July at Medina de Rioseco, with 14,000 men under the command of Bessierès, he fought against over 20,000 Spaniards. Lasalle marched towards Vitoria, commanding the rearguard, and protecting the French from another breach made by the enemy. As a result of these actions, he was named Grand Officer of the Legion of Honor and made a Count of the Empire.

On 7 November he fought at the Battle of Burgos. The untrained Spanish militias were unable to form infantry squares and scattered in the face of massed French cavalry, while the stubborn Spanish and Walloon Guards stood their ground in vain. A few days later, at the Battle of Villa Viejo, he captured seven cannons and four flags. On 15 March, Leval's division and Lasalle's cavalry crossed the Tagus River at Talavera. On the next day, they were joined by Victor-Perrin, heading Villatte’s and Ruffin's divisions, at Arzobispo. The rest of the cavalry, along with the artillery and the baggage, was sent to Almaraz. Two days later, Lasalle reached Meza de Ibor and fought the Spanish troops, forcing them out of their defensive position on the Tagus.

=== Battle of Medellín ===
Lasalle then joined the Battle of Medellín. The Spanish had an army almost twice the size of the French and Lasalle's position was somewhat vulnerable. The Guadiana River was only a mile behind him and he recognized how dangerous a retreat would be, given the close confines of the narrow bridge across it. But Lasalle had been reinforced with seven infantry battalions from Villatte, so once he saw the Spanish routing to the west he ordered a powerful counter-attack. He also attacked frontally, and before long his French dragoons were rolling over the centre of the Spanish army, which was attempting to flee in any way it could. Cuesta's army effectively ceased to exist. However, Lasalle was recalled from Spain in 1809 as the war was unfinished.

== Final battles in Austria ==
=== Battle of Aspern-Essling ===
Lasalle joined the French Army for its 1809 Campaign along the Danube. He arrived just before Napoleon's push across the Danube at Aspern-Essling and was sent to scout the location of the Austrian army. The first stage of the operation began on 13 May 1809, laying a bridge of boats over the first arm of the Danube to Lobau. Then, the advance guard and Lasalle's light cavalry would pass into Lobau, together with the material needed to bridge the second arm to the left bank. As soon as this was finished, Molitor’s division and Lasalle's four light cavalry regiments passed over and Lasalle's horsemen fanned out into the plain. There were no travellers or couriers to be intercepted there, as there had always been in Prussia and Spain; consequently, Lasalle's officers had nothing to go on but the evidence of their own eyes and ears.

On the morning of the 21st, great masses of men, guns and wagons had assembled on the island. In the next four hours, both Aspern and Essling were taken and retaken several times. Napoleon ordered Lasalle's cavalry regiments to aid Marulaz's distressed troops, but General Liechtenstein anticipated this manoeuvre sending nine regiments to drive off Lasalle, engaging him frontally with four regiments and using the remaining five to charge his flank. Lasalle fought them off, buying time for the hard-pressed French infantry in Aspern.

At 7 p.m. Lasalle mustered his troops for another charge. Lasalle managed to defeat the first Habsburg line, but Austrian hussars captured quite a few men of the 24th Chasseurs. Outnumbered on the second day of battle, Napoleon ordered Lasalle and Espagne to defend a sector which the IV Corps had been thrust into. Taking advantage of the fog, Lasalle's men fought along the defensive ground running between the two villages, charging the Austrians in a series of short, sharp charges intended to prevent them from launching a coordinated attack. These tactics worked, allowing General Boudet to gain complete control of Essling.

Later, during Marshal Lannes' advance, Lasalle and Marulaz's cavalry charged at least three times to support the infantry. Although the French were forced to withdraw, Lasalle's determination and courage prevented the withdrawal from becoming a rout.

=== Death at the Battle of Wagram ===
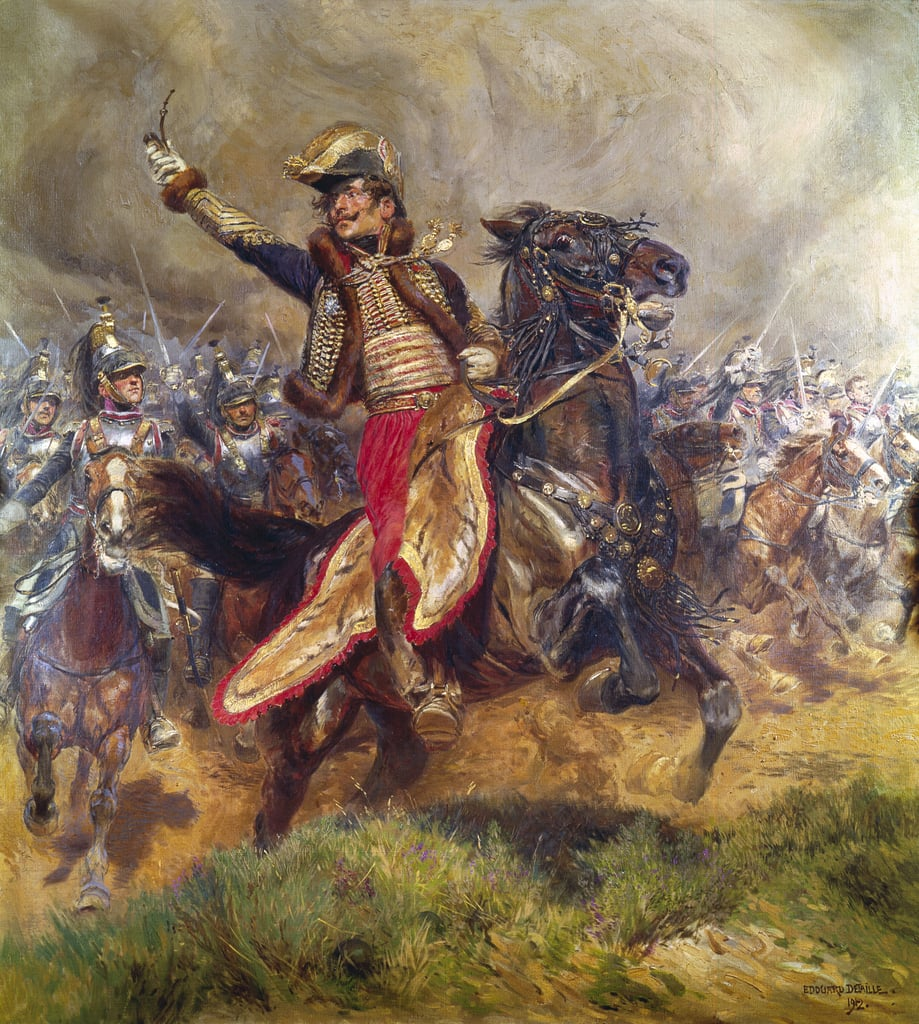
Lasalle's last charge at Wagram, by Édouard Detaille (1912)

On 5 July 1809, Lasalle fought at the Battle of Wagram commanding a Light Cavalry Division in the IV Corps of Marshal Masséna.

On the night of the second day, Lasalle's men had still not been ordered to fight so Lasalle went to Marshal Masséna to ask permission to pursue the enemy, but Masséna ordered him to go to the aid of General MacDonald. Lasalle was temporarily separated from his division so when he accidentally disturbed a battalion of enemy infantry, he charged them with the 1st Cuirassier Regiment. Lasalle was shot in the chest but continued to charge. The enemy infantry broke and was routed as Lasalle and the regiment pursued them. But as Lasalle continued to charge, he was shot between the eyes by a Hungarian grenadier and was killed instantly. Marulaz tried to avenge Lasalle by leading a hussar regiment against a square of Austrian infantry but was wounded in the attempt and had to be carried to the rear.

== Posthumous honours ==
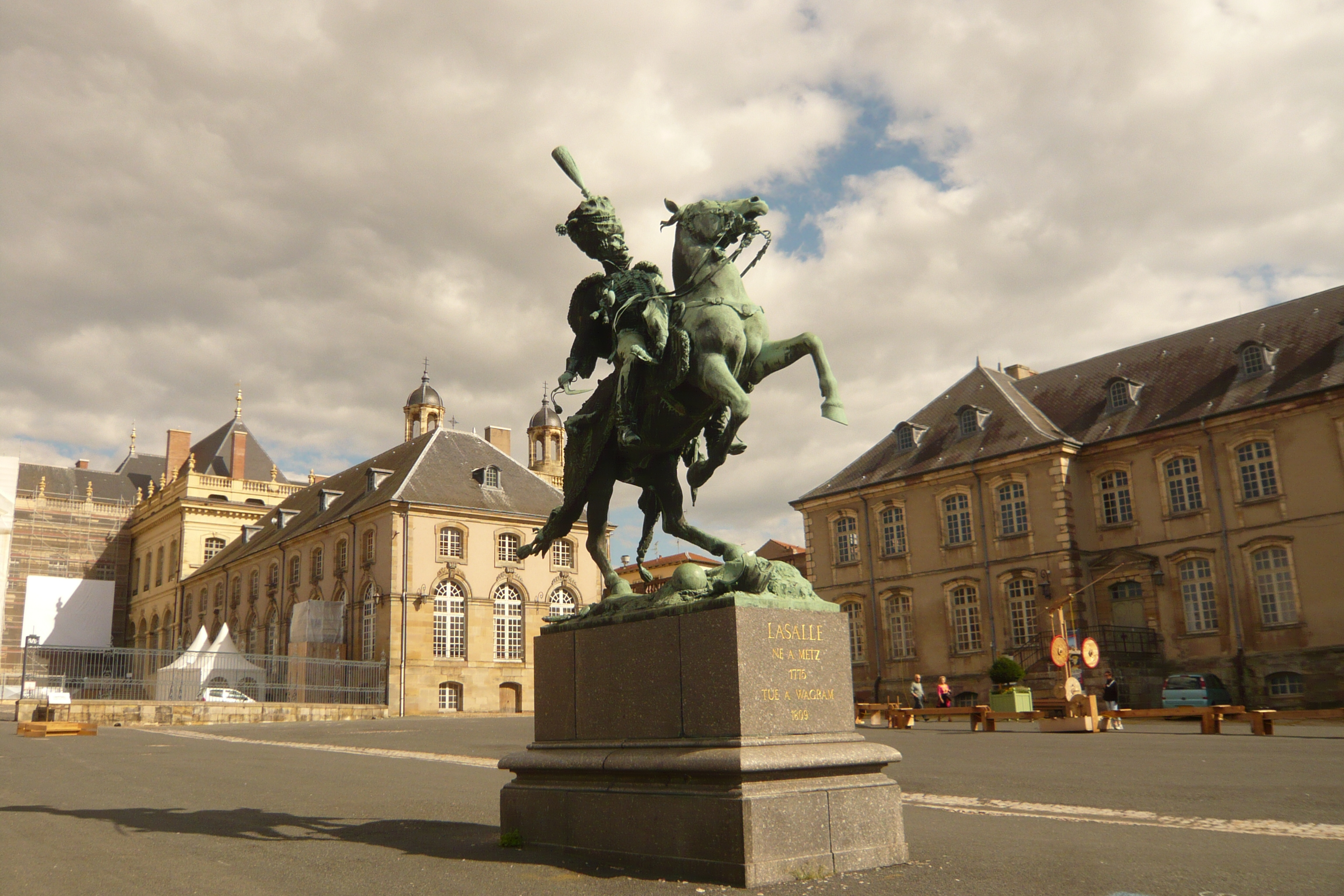
Statue of General Lasalle in Château de Lunéville

- A street in Metz was named after him.
- His portrait was placed in one of the salons of the Hotel de Ville.
- In 1891, his remains were repatriated from Austria and entombed at Les Invalides.
- In 1893, an equestrian statue of him was erected in Lunéville.
- He has a bust in the Gallery of Battles of the Palace of Versailles.
- His name is marked on a pillar of the Arc de Triomphe.
- His name is used for a cycling event in the Netherlands, the Tour de Lasalle.
- He is briefly mentioned in Edgar Allan Poe's short story, "The Pit and the Pendulum" in which he ultimately saves the condemned main character from being executed by the Spanish Inquisition.

== Sources ==
- Haythornthwaite, Philip (2001). Napoleon's Commanders (1): c1792-1809. (Elite, Vol.1), Osprey Publishing. ISBN 1-84176-055-2
