= Abel (given name) =

- Gender: Masculine
- Name day: 2 January (Denmark, Hungary, Poland); 6 January (Estonia); 5 August (France); 28 December (Spain); 30 December (Sweden)

Origin
- Origin: Hebrew/Assyrian
- Meaning: breath, vapour (Hebrew) son (Assyrian)

Other names
- Alternative spelling: Ábel; Aabel; А́бель
- Variant forms: Avel; Aapeli

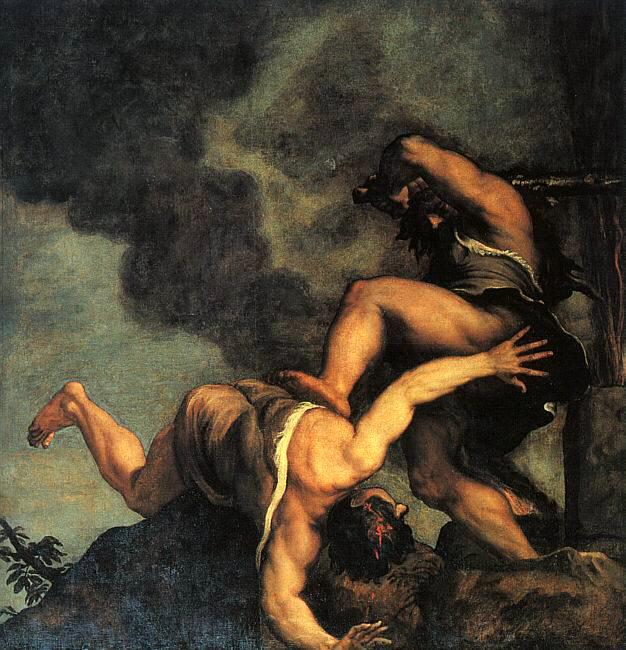
Titian - Cain and Abel

Abel is a biblical first name which may derive from the Hebrew Hebel, itself derived from hevel (breath or vapour), or from the Assyrian for son. In reference to the biblical story, Abel is usually linked with his brother who killed him, as in Cain and Abel.

Based on its occurrence in the Bible, the name Abel has been used in many European languages; in Sweden it is attested since 1496, and in English it was mostly used by the Puritans in the 17th century.

The variants used in the Russian language are А́бель (Abel) and А́вель (Avel). in Finnish it is spelled Aapeli.

== People ==
Note: Persons may be listed in more than one subsection.

=== Arts and entertainment ===
- Abel Fernandez (1930–2016), American actor
- Abel Ferrara (born 1951), American film director
- Abel Gance (1889–1981), French film director, producer, writer and actor
- Abel Góngora (born 1983), Spanish animator and director
- Abel Korzeniowski (born 1972), Polish film score composer
- Abel Pintos (born 1984), Argentinian singer-songwriter
- Abel Salazar (actor) (1917–1995), Mexican actor, director and producer
- Abel Salazar (scientist) (1889–1946), Portuguese physician and painter
- Abel Seyler (1730–1801), Swiss banker and theatre director and patron
- Abel Talamantez (born 1978), Mexican-American singer
- Abel Tesfaye (born 1990), Canadian musician better known as The Weeknd

=== Nobility ===
- Abel, King of Denmark (1218–1252)
- Abel, Lord of Langeland (1252–1279)

=== Politics ===
- Abel Darlington (1810–1897), American politician from Pennsylvania
- Abel Goumba (1926–2009), Central African Republic politician
- Abel Maldonado (born 1967), American politician
- Abel Millington (1787–1838), American politician
- Abel Muzorewa (1925–2010), Rhodesian/Zimbabwean politician and bishop
- Abel Pacheco (born 1933), Costa Rican president
- Abel Santamaría (1927–1953), Cuban political activist
- Abel Tapia (born 1949), American politician from Colorado
- Abel Upshur (1790 – 1844), U.S. Secretary of State
- Abel Xavier Nzuzi Lubota, Angolan politician

=== Religion ===
- Saint Abel (Syrian), a saint of the Syrian church
- Abel of Reims (fl. 744–747), saint, archbishop of Reims and abbot of Lobbes
- Abel of Tacla Haimonot, monk and saint of the Coptic Orthodox Church
- Abel Muzorewa (1925–2010), Rhodesian/Zimbabwean bishop and politician

=== Sports ===
- Abel Aguilar (born 1985), Colombian footballer
- Abel Antón (born 1962), Spanish long-distance runner
- Abel Balbo (born 1966), Argentine footballer
- Abel Braga (born 1952), Brazilian football manager
- Abel Buades (born 1977), Spanish footballer
- Abel Camará (born 1990), Bissau-Guinean footballer
- Abel Caputo (born 2000), Venezuelan footballer
- Abel Casquete (born 1997), Ecuadorian footballer
- Abel Chimukoko (born 1972), Zimbabwean long-distance runner
- Abel Conejo (born 1998), Spanish footballer
- Abel De Los Santos (born 1992), Dominican baseball player
- Abel Ferreira (born 1978), Portuguese footballer
- Abel Gebor (born 1990), Liberian footballer
- Abel Gigli (born 1990), Italian footballer
- Abel Hammond (born 1985), Ghanaian footballer
- Abel Hernández (born 1990), Uruguayan footballer
- Abel Khaled (born 1992), French-Algerian footballer
- Abel Kirui (born 1982), Kenyan long-distance runner
- Abel Laudonio (1938–2014), Argentinian boxer
- Abel Lizotte (1870–1926), American baseball player
- Abel Lobatón (born 1977), Peruvian footballer
- Abel Mabaso (born 1991), South African footballer
- Abel Mamo (born 1994), Ethiopian footballer
- Abel Masuero (born 1988), Argentine footballer
- Abel Mendoza (born 2003), American footballer
- Abel Miglietti (born 1946), Portuguese footballer
- Abel Molinero (born 1989), Spanish footballer
- Abel Moreno (born 1995), Spanish footballer
- Abel Gómez Moreno (born 1982), Spanish footballer
- Abel Mutai (born 1988), Kenyan long-distance runner
- Abel Peralta (born 1989), Argentine footballer
- Abel Redenut (born 1995), Papua New Guinean footballer
- Abel Resino (born 1960), Spanish football player and manager
- Abel Rodrigues (1922–2010), American basketball player
- Abel Ruiz (born 2000), Spanish footballer
- Abel Segovia (born 1979), Spanish footballer
- Abel Silva (born 1969), Portuguese football player and coach
- Abel Stensrud (born 2002), Norwegian footballer
- Abel Miguel Suárez (born 1991), Spanish footballer
- Abel Tamata (born 1990), Dutch footballer
- Abel Tasman (born 2014), American racehorse
- Abel Thermeus (born 1983), Haitian footballer
- Abel Trujillo (born 1983), American mixed martial artist
- Abel Valdez (born 1987), Argentine footballer
- Abel Xavier (born 1972), Portuguese former footballer
- Abel Yalew (born 1996), Ethiopian footballer

=== Other ===
- Abel Briones Ruiz (born 1973), Mexican businessman and suspected drug lord
- Abel Payne Caldwell (1865–1917), American journalist, newspaper publisher, and editor
- Abel Douay (1809–1870), French general
- Abel Lefranc (1863–1952), French literary historian
- Abel Makashvili (1860–1920), Georgian prince and soldier
- Abel Niépce de Saint-Victor (1805–1870), French photographic inventor
- Abel Pavet de Courteille (1821–1889), French linguist
- Abel Salazar (scientist) (1889–1946), Portuguese physician and painter
- Abel Stearns (1798–1871), trader and landowner in California
- Abel Tasman (1603–1659), Dutch seafarer, explorer and merchant
- Abel Wolman (1892–1989), American inventor, scientist, and pioneer of modern sanitary engineering

== Fictional characters ==
- Abel Magwitch, a leading character in the novel Great Expectatations by Charles Dickens
- Abel Rosnovoski, lead character in the novel Kane and Abel, by Jeffrey Archer
- Abel, protagonist in W.H. Hudson's novel Green Mansions
- Abel Nightroad, in the anime Trinity Blood
- Abel (DC Comics), a host of horror comic anthologies
- Abel, Mabel's brother in the 1976–2000 comic strip Motley's Crew
- Abel Teller, the son of Jax Teller in the FX series Sons of Anarchy
- Abel, lead character in King of Demons games
- Abel, in the Battle Arena Toshinden video game series
- Abel, in the video game Street Fighter IV
- Abel, in the video game The Walking Dead: The Final Season
- Abel, a playable character in the video game series Fire Emblem
- Abel, in the animated series The Amazing Digital Circus
- Abel the Bard, the false identity assumed by Mance Rayder in the book series A Song of Ice and Fire, by George R. R. Martin

== See also ==
- Abel-François Villemain (1790–1870), French writer, professor and politician
- Saint Abel (disambiguation)
- Abel (surname)
- Abelson, surname
- Abell (disambiguation)
- Abele (disambiguation)
- Abels (disambiguation)
