= Abel (disambiguation) =

Abel was a son of Adam and Eve in the Bible. According to the Bible, he was the first person to die, murdered by his brother Cain.

Abel may also refer to:

== People and fictional characters ==
- Abel (given name), including a list of people and fictional characters
- Abel (surname)
- Niels Henrik Abel, a Norwegian mathematician

== Places ==
- Mount Abel (British Columbia), Canada
- Abel Lake, New Zealand
- Abel, Alabama, US, an unincorporated community
- Mount Abel, former name of Cerro Noroeste, California, US
- Abel Nunatak, a nunatak in Antarctica
- Abel (אבעל), Yiddish name of the municipality of Obeliai, Lithuania
- Abel (crater), an impact crater on the Moon
- Abel (אבל), meaning "stream" in Hebrew, the name of several biblical sites in modern-day Israel:
  - Abel-beth-maachah, in Galilee
  - Abel-meholah, in the Jordan Valley

== Science and technology ==
- Abel (hominid), the name given to the only specimen of Australopithecus bahrelghazali
- Abel Prize, an annual prize in mathematics
- Advanced Boolean Expression Language, hardware description language for developing programmable logic devices
- Abel, a piece of change ringing software

== Music ==
- Abel (band), an American rock band
- ABEL, an album by Abel Pintos
- Abel (EP), by Japanese rock band Unsraw
- "Abel", a single by The National from Alligator
- Abel Tesfaye, Canadian singer known professionally as the Weeknd

== Other uses ==
- Abel (1986 film), a Dutch drama film
- Abel (2010 film), a Mexican comedy film
- Abel meteorite, part of the Cranbourne meteorite, found in Australia
- Abel Stadium, a sports stadium for Nebraska Wesleyan University in Lincoln, Nebraska
- Abel, Inc., a Japan-based Dreamcast video game developer and publisher, founded in 1997
- Tropical Storm Abel, from the 1996 Pacific typhoon season

== See also ==
- Abelson, a surname
- Abell (disambiguation)
- Abele (disambiguation)
- Abels (disambiguation)
- Abelian (disambiguation)
- Able (disambiguation)
- Abil, a village in central Syria
- Cain and Abel (disambiguation)
- Saint Abel (disambiguation)
