= Abeles =

Abeles is an English and Jewish surname, derived from the biblical name Abel. Notable people with the surname include:

- Benjamin Abeles (1925–2020), American physicist
- Edward Abeles (1869–1919), American actor
- Florin Abelès (1922–2005), French physicist
- John H Abeles (born 1945), American businessman
- Kim Victoria Abeles (born 1952), American artist
- Michele Abeles (born 1977), American artist
- Peter Abeles (1924–1999), Australian businessman
- Marcus Abeles (1837–1894), Austrian physician
- Moshe Abeles (born 1936), Israeli brain researcher
- Norman Abeles (born 1928), American psychologist
- Ruth Abeles (born 1942), Israeli gymnast
- Sigmund Abeles (born 1934), American artist

== See also ==
- Abele (disambiguation)
