= Abele =

Abele may refer to:

== Places ==
- Abele (village), in the city of Poperinge, Belgium
- Abele, Polish name for the municipality of Obeliai, Lithuania
- Abele Nunatak, Marie Byrd Land, Antarctica

== People ==
- Abele (surname)
- Abele Blanc (born 1954), Italian mountaineer and mountain guide

== Other uses ==
- Cyclone Abele, a tropical cyclone
- Abelé, a Champagne house
- Abele (play), an Italian play by Vittoria Alfieri
- USS Abele (AN-58), an American Ailanthus-class net laying ship
- USS Mannert L. Abele (DD-733), American Allen M. Sumner-class destroyer
- Populus alba, also known as the abele or white poplar, a tree species

== See also ==
- Abel (disambiguation)
- Abell (disambiguation)
- Abels (disambiguation)
- Able (disambiguation)
- Abeles, a surname
