= 1805 in literature =

This article contains information about the literary events and publications of 1805.

== Events ==
- January 18–September 6 – Samuel Taylor Coleridge serves as Acting Public Secretary in Malta.
- Early – Jacob Grimm is invited to Paris as an assistant to Friedrich Carl von Savigny.There Grimm strengthened his taste for Medieval literature. Towards the close of the year, Grimm returned to Kassel, where his mother Dorothea Grimm and his brother Wilhelm Grimm had settled after Wilhelm finished his studies. The following year (1806), Jacob obtained a position in the war office with a small salary of 100 thalers. He complained that he had to exchange his stylish Paris suit for a stiff uniform and a pigtail, but the role gave him spare time for the pursuit of his studies.
- October 12 – The new Theatre Royal, Bath, opens in England, replacing the Old Orchard Street Theatre.
- Unknown date – Henry Thomas Colebrooke completes and publishes the first translation into English of the Sanskrit Aitareya Upanishad.In the same year, Colebrooke published his Sanskrit Grammar (1805), some papers on the religious ceremonies of the Hindus, and his Essay on the Vedas (1805), for a long time the standard work in English on the subject.

== New books ==
=== Fiction ===
- Eugenia de Acton – The Nuns of the Desert
- Sophie Ristaud Cottin – Mathilde (translated as The Saracen; or Matilda and Malek Adhel: A Crusade Romance)
- Charlotte Dacre – Confessions of the Nun of St. Omer
- Robert Charles Dallas – The Morlands
- Maria Edgeworth – The Modern Griselda
- Jean-Baptiste Cousin de Grainville – Le Dernier Homme
- Elizabeth Helme:
  - The Chronicles of Christabelle de Mowbray
  - The Pilgrims of the Cross
- William Henry Ireland – Gondez the Monk
- Matthew Gregory Lewis – The Bravo of Venice
- Mary Meeke – The Wonder of the Village
- Anna Maria Porter
  - A Sailor's Friendship
  - A Soldier's Love
- Jan Potocki – The Manuscript Found in Saragossa (Manuscrit trouvé à Saragosse, first ten "days")
- Catherine Selden – Villa Nova

=== Children ===
- Ann Taylor and Jane Taylor – Original Poems for Infant Minds by several young persons, vol. 2
- Achim von Arnim and Clemens Brentano (edited and composed) – Des Knaben Wunderhorn, vol. 1

=== Drama ===
- Marianne Chambers – The School for Friends
- George Colman the Younger –Who Wants a Guinea?
- Alexandre-Vincent Pineux Duval – Le Menuisier de Livonie
- Robert William Elliston – The Venetian Outlaw
- Elizabeth Inchbald – To Marry or Not to Marry
- Matthew Lewis – Rugantino
- Thomas Morton – The School of Reform
- Adam Gottlob Oehlenschläger – Hakon Jarl
- Henry James Pye – A Prior Claim
- Frederick Reynolds – The Delinquent
- John Tobin – The Honey Moon

=== Poetry ===
- Ivan Pnin – God
- Walter Scott – The Lay of the Last Minstrel
- Martin Archer Shee – Rhymes on Art
- Robert Southey – Madoc

=== Non-fiction ===
- Hosea Ballou – A Treatise on Atonement
- James Belcher – "Treatice [sic.] on Boxing by Mr. J. Belcher" (article in George Barrington, New London Year)
- Henry Thomas Colebrooke
  - Essay on the Vedas
  - A Grammar of the Sanskrit Language
- Denis Diderot (posthumously) – Rameau's Nephew (in a German translation by Goethe)
- William Henry Ireland – The Confessions of William Henry Ireland
- Robert Jenkinson, 2nd Earl of Liverpool – Treatise on the Coins of the Realm
- Ellis Cornelia Knight – Description of Latium or La Campagna di Roma
- Richard Payne Knight – An Analytical Inquiry into the Principles of Taste
- Jane Marcet (anonymously) – Conversations on Chemistry
- Mercy Otis Warren – History of the Rise, Progress, and Termination of the American Revolution

== Births ==
- February 4 – William Harrison Ainsworth, English historical novelist (died 1882)
- April 2 – Hans Christian Andersen, Danish writer (died 1875)
- July 29 – Alexis de Tocqueville, French writer (died 1859)
- August 29 – F. D. Maurice, English theologian and novelist (died 1872)
- September 19 – John Stevens Cabot Abbott, American historian (died 1877)
- December 23 – Joseph Smith, American founder and prophet of the Latter Day Saint movement (killed 1844)

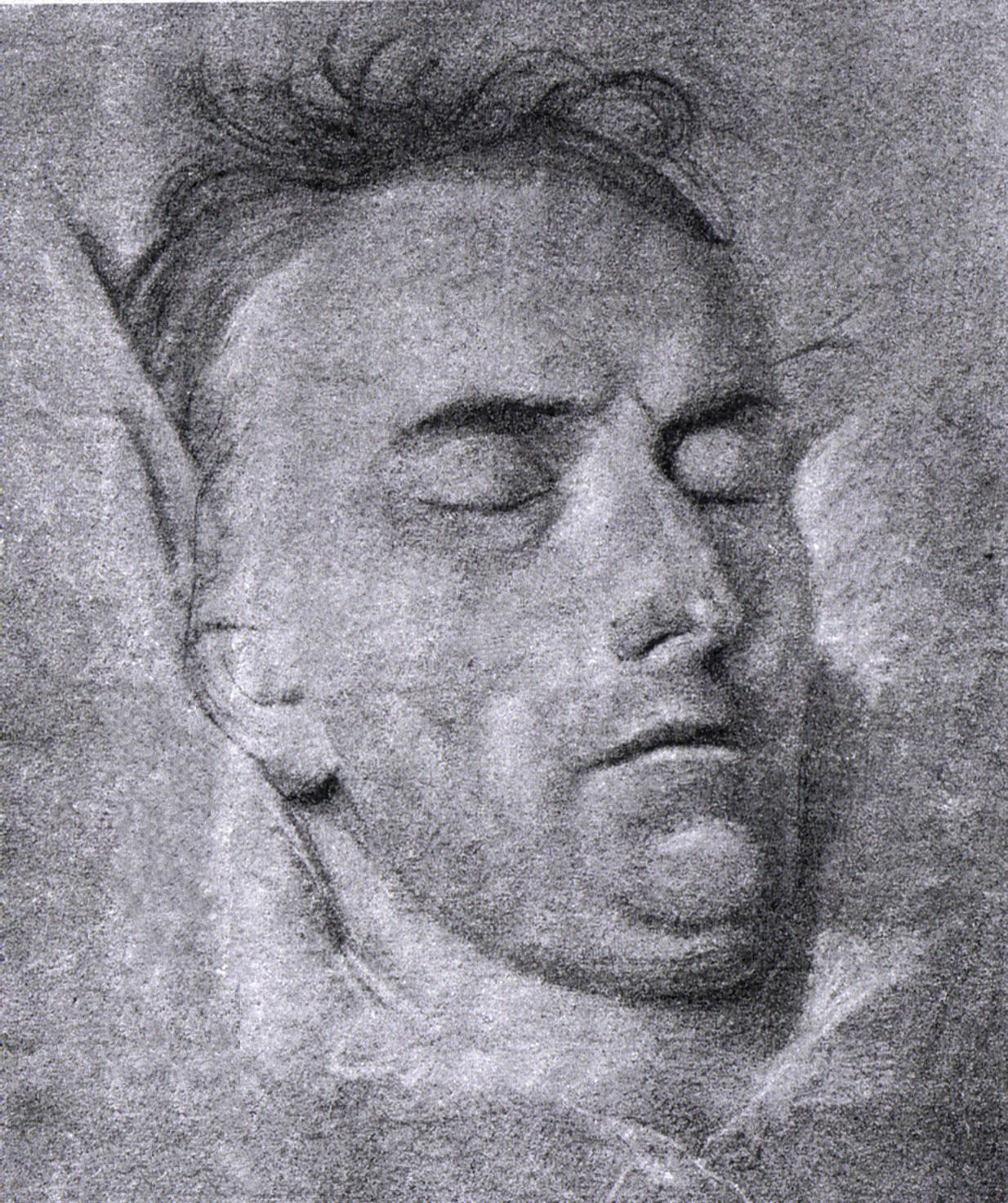
Schiller on his deathbed – drawing by Ferdinand Jagemann

== Deaths ==
- February 24 – Ralph Broome, English pamphleteer (born 1742)
- March 29 – Jean Elliot, Scottish poet (born 1727)
- May 9 – Friedrich Schiller, German playwright (born 1759)
- May 25 – William Paley, English philosopher (born 1743)
  - Anna Maria Rückerschöld, Swedish author (born 1725)
- June 18 – Arthur Murphy (Charles Ranger), Irish writer (born 1727)
- July 27 – Brian Merriman (Brian Mac Giolla Meidhre), Irish-language poet (born c. 1749)
- August 3 – Christopher Anstey, English poet (born 1724)
- Early September – Mary Deverell, English religious writer, essayist and poet (born 1731)
- September 3 – Johann Martin Abele, German publisher (born 1753)
- December 21 – Manuel Maria Barbosa du Bocage, Portuguese poet (born 1765)
- unknown dates
  - Ji Yun (纪昀), Chinese poet and scholar (born 1724)
  - Anna Hammar-Rosén, Swedish publisher (born 1735)
