= Ávila (disambiguation) =

Ávila is a city in the province of Ávila, Castile and León, Spain.

Ávila or Avila may also refer to:

== Places ==
=== Spain ===
- Province of Ávila, in the autonomous community of Castile and León, Spain
- Ávila (Congress of Deputies constituency), the electoral district covering the province
- Ávila (Cortes of Castile and León constituency)
- Ávila (Senate constituency)
- Roman Catholic Diocese of Ávila, in Ávila, Spain

=== Elsewhere ===
- Avila (Tampa), an affluent neighborhood in North Tampa
- Əvilə, a municipality in Azerbaijan
- Avila Beach, California
- Cerro El Ávila, a mountain near Caracas, Venezuela

== People with the name ==
- Ávila (surname) (variants include Avila, de Ávila, de Avila, D'Ávila or D'Avila, Dávila, Davila or Abila)

== Other uses ==
- Ávila Cathedral, a Romanesque and Gothic church in Ávila, Spain
- Avila (duo), a musical duo from Michigan
- Avila TV, a Venezuelan television channel
- Avila University, in the U.S. state of Missouri
- Plan Ávila, a military operation ordered by Venezuelan President Hugo Chávez in April 2002
- Real Ávila CF, a Spanish football team based in Ávila, Spain
- Samsung S5230, also known as Samsung Avila

== See also ==
- Avilla (disambiguation)
- Ciego de Ávila, in Cuba
