= Avilya =

Avilya may refer to:

- Avilya, alternative name of Əvilə, a village in Lerik District of Azerbaijan
- Avilya, a diminutive of the Russian male first name Avel
