= Ables =

Ables may refer to:

- Ables, Texas, US, a ghost town
- 5175 Ables, an asteroid
- Harry Ables (1883–1951), American Major League Baseball pitcher
- Tony Ables (born 1954), American serial killer
- Adult Blood Lead Epidemiology and Surveillance, a US National Institute for Occupational Safety and Health program

== See also ==
- Jon St. Ables (1912–1999), British-born Canadian cartoon artist
- Able (disambiguation)
- Ables Springs, Texas, US, an unincorporated community
