= Abele (surname) =

Abele is a surname. It may refer to:

- Anton Abele (born 1992), Swedish politician
- Arnulf Abele (1914–2000), German military officer
- Arthur Abele (born 1986), German decathlete
- Chris Abele (born 1967), American businessman and philanthropist
- Christoph Ignaz Abele (1628–1685), Austrian jurist
- Doris Abele, German marine biologist
- Ekkehard Abele, German opera singer
- Johann Martin Abele (1753–1805), German publisher
- John Abele (born 1937), American businessman
- Julian Abele (1881–1950), American architect
- Lawrence G. Abele (born 1947), American academic
- Mannert L. Abele (1903–1942), American naval officer
- Matthias Abele (1618–1677), Austrian jurist
- Pete Abele (1916–2000), American politician

== Middle name ==
- Julian Abele Cook Jr. (1930–2017), United States District Court judge
