= Avelya =

Avelya may refer to:

- Avelya, alternative name of Əvilə, a village in Lerik District of Azerbaijan
- Avelya, a diminutive of the Russian male first name Avel
