= Non-abelian =

Non-abelian or nonabelian may refer to:

- Non-abelian group, in mathematics, a group that is not abelian (commutative)
- Non-abelian gauge theory, in physics, a gauge group that is non-abelian

== See also ==
- Non-abelian gauge transformation, a gauge transformation
- Non-abelian class field theory, in class field theory
- Nonabelian cohomology, a cohomology
- Abelian (disambiguation)
