= Cain and Abel (disambiguation) =

Cain and Abel were the first sons of Adam and Eve in the Bible.

Cain and Abel may also refer to:

== Television ==
- Cain and Abel (Argentine TV series), a 2010 Argentine telenovela
- Cain and Abel (Japanese TV series), a 2016 Japanese television drama series
- Cain and Abel (South Korean TV series), a 2009 South Korean television drama series

== Other ==
- Cain and Abel (Titian), a 1540s painting by Titian
- Cain and Abel (Tintoretto), a c. 1550 painting by Tintoretto
- Cain and Abel (1982 film), a Philippine action drama film
- Cain and Abel (2006 film), an American independent comedy film
- Cain and Abel (comics), a pair of fictional characters in the DC Comics universe
- Cain and Abel (software), a password recovery tool

== See also ==
- Cain at Abel, Philippine television drama series
- Cains & Abels, a rock music group
- "Cane and Able" (House episode)
- "Kanes and Abel's", an episode of the television series Veronica Mars
- Kane and Abel (disambiguation)
- Abel (disambiguation)
- Cain (disambiguation)
