= Ableson =

Ableson is a surname derived as a variant of the surname Abelson, meaning son of Abel. People with the surname include:

- Bruce Ableson (born 1963), American computer programmer and website developer
- Andrew Ableson, actor in the film Boyfriends
- Brad Ableson, film director who worked on Minions: The Rise of Gru and Legends of Chamberlain Heights

== See also ==
- Abelson, a surname
