= Call Me Up =

Studio album by Cains & Abels
- Released: May 19, 2009
- Genre: Rock and roll
- Length: 43:02
- Label: States Rights Records, CD 2009; Positive Beat Recordings, LP 2011
- Producer: Erik Hall

Cains & Abels chronology
Clean Air, Cloud Science (2005)	Call Me Up (2009)

Call Me Up is the 2009 debut album by Chicago band Cains & Abels. This album was released by States Rights Records in the U.S. In 2011 Positive Beat Recordings issued a vinyl edition with one additional track, "Forty Days and Forty Nights."

== Track listing ==
1. "Warm Rock" - 2:41
2. "Call Me Up, Pt. 2" - 4:06
3. "Never Be Alone" - 5:38
4. "Killed By Birds" - 4:59
5. "Metal In My Mouth" - 6:33
6. "Hard Hearts" - 3:46
7. "Black Black Black" - 3:22
8. "Dark Days" - 4:47
9. "Call Me Up, Pt. 1" - 7:10

Vinyl Only Bonus Track: "Forty Days and Forty Nights"
