= Kane and Abel =

Kane and Abel may refer to:

- Kane and Abel (novel), the 1979 novel by Jeffrey Archer
- Kane and Abel (miniseries), a 1985 miniseries starring Peter Strauss as Rosnovski and Sam Neill as Kane
- Kane & Abel (group), an American rap duo from New Orleans

== See also ==
- Cain and Abel (disambiguation)
- "Kanes and Abel's", the seventeenth episode of the first season of the American mystery television series Veronica Mars
