= Marcus Abeles =

Austrian internist (1837–1894)

- Born: 8 August 1837; Nedraschitz, Bohemia, Austrian Empire
- Died: 31 December 1894 (aged 57); Vienna, Austria-Hungary
- Burial place: Döbling Cemetery, Vienna
- Education: University of Vienna
- Medical career
- Awards: Knight's Cross of the Order of Franz Joseph; Order of the Crown of Italy

Marcus Mordechai Abeles (8 August 1837 – 31 December 1894) was a physician and Privatdozent at the University of Vienna.

== Biography ==
Marcus Abeles was born in 1837 in Nedražice, Kostelec, Bohemia, to Elisabeth (née Babett) and Samuel Abeles.

Having completed a classical course at Prague he was matriculated at the University of Vienna in 1858, and was graduated from there in 1863 with the degree of M.D. Abeles did not at once become a practitioner, but continued his technical training at the Allgemeines Krankenhaus of Vienna. At the conclusion of his studies he left Europe and settled in Cairo, Egypt, where he soon gained a high reputation and commanded a large practise, besides occupying the position of director of the European Hospital there. His professional career in Egypt terminated in Alexandria, to which city he removed on being delegated by the Austrian government to the International Sanitary Commission.

In 1870 Abeles returned to Europe and settled in Carlsbad, practising with great success there during the summer months, and devoting the rest of his time to scientific research in Vienna. The results of his careful investigations became the property of the public when in 1884, upon the recommendation of the medical faculty of the University of Vienna, Abeles was invited to deliver to the students of his alma mater a course of lectures on internal pathology. In the same year he was appointed Privatdozent at the university, which position he held till his death.

Abeles was a knight of the Order of Franz Joseph, and of the Order of the Crown of Italy. His numerous essays treat chiefly of diabetes, and were published in the Jahrbücher der Kaiserlich Königlichen Gesellschaft der Aerzte, Sitzungsberichte der Kaiserlichen Akademie der Wissenschaften, Wiener Medicinische Wochenschrift, Zeitschrift für Physiologische Chemie, and Centralblatt für die Medicinische Wissenschaft.

He died of sudden cardiac arrest in 1894, at the age of 57.
