= Saul (Alfieri) =

- Author: Vittorio Alfieri
- Language: Italian
- Genre: Drama
- Publication place: Italy

Saul is a theatrical tragedy in five acts, written by Vittorio Alfieri in 1782, in which the eponymous protagonist simultaneously embodies the tragic heroism of both tyrant and victim. This play marks the high point of Italian tragedy and pre-romantic poetry.

The story is taken from the Bible, and is about Saul's last hours during the war against the Philistines.

In the narration, Alfieri adhered to the unity of time (one day only), of space (Gelboé) and of action, which were strictly Aristotelian.

The tragedy is dedicated to his friend Tommaso Valperga di Caluso, philosopher and teacher of oriental languages.

== Plot ==
Saul, a brave warrior, was crowned king of Israel at the request of the people and consecrated by the priest Samuel, who anointed him in the name of God. Over time, however, Saul turned away from God and ended up doing various acts of impiety. Then Samuel, by order of God, consecrated a humble shepherd as king: David. He was called to the court of Saul to appease the king's soul with his song, and there he succeeded in obtaining the friendship of Jonathan, son of the king, and the hand of the young daughter of Saul, Micol.

However, David generated a strong envy in the king, who saw in him a usurper and at the same time saw his past youth in it. David was persecuted by Saul and forced to take refuge in the lands of the Philistines (and for this accused of treason).

The story of the Saul narrates the last hours of the king's life and sees the return of David, who as a brave warrior rushed to the aid of his people at war with the Philistines, despite knowing full well the risk that this could entail for his life. David is ready to be killed by the king, but first he wants to be able to fight with his people.

Saul seeing him wants to kill him, but after listening to him he is convinced to give him command of the army. David at one point, however, makes a mistake, speaking of "two lambs" in Israel, and this generates Saul's murderous delirium towards the young man. Saul then explains to Jonathan the harsh law of the throne, according to which "brother kills brother". Before the king comes the priest Achimelech, who brings divine condemnation to Jonathan and informs him of the coronation of David. The king has the priest killed, and from there he will go more and more towards delirium.

In the last act, Saul foresees in a nightmare his own death and that of his sons and with a vision full of blood he awakens, and grasps the reality of the facts: the Philistines are attacking them, and the Israelite army is unable to defend itself. At this point Saul finds himself again, and by killing himself he regains the integrity of a man and a king.
