= Abelson =

- Language: Swedish; Yiddish

Other names
- Variant form: Abel

Abelson, originating from both Swedish and Yiddish, and derived from the name Abel, is the surname of:

- Alan Abelson (1925–2013), American journalist
- Dave Abelson (born 1975), Canadian tennis player
- Evelyn Abelson (1886–1967), English artist
- Hal Abelson, American computer scientist
- Hope Abelson (1910–2006), American artist and arts philanthropist
- John Abelson (born 1939), American biochemist
- Matthew Abelson, American musician
- Neva Abelson (1910–2000), American physician
- Peter Abelsson (born 1977), Swedish football player
- Philip Abelson (1913–2004), American nuclear physicist
- Raziel Abelson (1921–2017), American philosopher
- Robert Abelson (1928–2005), American political scientist
- Sophie Abelson, English actress

== See also ==
- Abelsonite, a mineral
- Abelson murine leukemia virus, also known as "Abelson's virus"
- Abelson's paradox
- Ableson, a surname
