= Able =

Able may refer to:

- Able (1920 automobile), a small French cyclecar
- Able (rocket stage), an upper stage for Vanguard, Atlas, and Thor rockets
- Able (surname)
- ABLE account, a U.S. savings plan for people with disabilities
- Able UK, British ship breaking and recycling company
- Able, Colorado, a community in the US
- Association for Better Living and Education, a non-profit Church of Scientology organization
- Oklahoma Alcoholic Beverage Laws Enforcement Commission, a.k.a. Able Commission
- USNS Able (T-AGOS-20), a U.S. Navy oceanographic survey ship
- Able space probes, probes in the Pioneer program
- Able, a U.S. 1946 nuclear weapon test, part of Operation Crossroads
- Able, one of the first two monkeys in space to return to Earth alive
- The first letter of the Able-Baker spelling alphabet

== See also ==
- Hurricane Able, three hurricanes in the early 1950s
- Abel (disambiguation)
- Ability (disambiguation)
- Ables (disambiguation)
