= Avilla =

Avilla may refer to:

- Avilla, Arkansas
- Avilla, Indiana
- Avilla, Missouri
- Avilla Township, Comanche County, Kansas

== See also ==
- Ávila (disambiguation)
