= Abels Moving Services =

UK-based moving company

- Company type: Removals, storage, move management, business and staff relocation
- Founded: 1958
- Headquarters: Brandon, Suffolk, UK
- Area served: Worldwide
- Key people: Philip Pertoldi, Neil Pertoldi, John Watson Paul Evans
- Website: www.abels.co.uk

Abels Moving Services is a UK-based moving company specialising in domestic and international relocation. The removal and storage company has its headquarters in Brandon, Suffolk, with facilities in London, Cambridge, Daventry covering the whole of the UK. It became the first removals firm to be granted a Royal Warrant in 1989, by appointment to HM the Queen for removals and storage services. As of 2016, the company still holds this warrant.

== History ==
Established in Norfolk in the UK in 1958, Abels was initially an offshoot from the Abels family auctioneering business. The firm became known as Abels of Watton, initially only based in the town, but subsequently opening depots in Huntingdon, St Albans, Colchester and Brandon, Suffolk.

In 1991, the Abel family sold the business to Hays plc, and then in 1998 a management buyout returned Abels to independent ownership. Abels was a shareholder in UniGroup Worldwide UTS which at the end of 2015 changed to become Harmony Relocation a company founded in Holland with worldwide stakeholders like Abels and Philip Pertoldi currently sits on the supervisory board as chairman. In October 2016 the Abels Group which consists of Gerson Relocation and Atlantic International Movers joined Momentous Relocation Ltd.

== See also ==
- Moving industry
- Relocation services
