= Kostelec (Tachov District) =

- Municipality
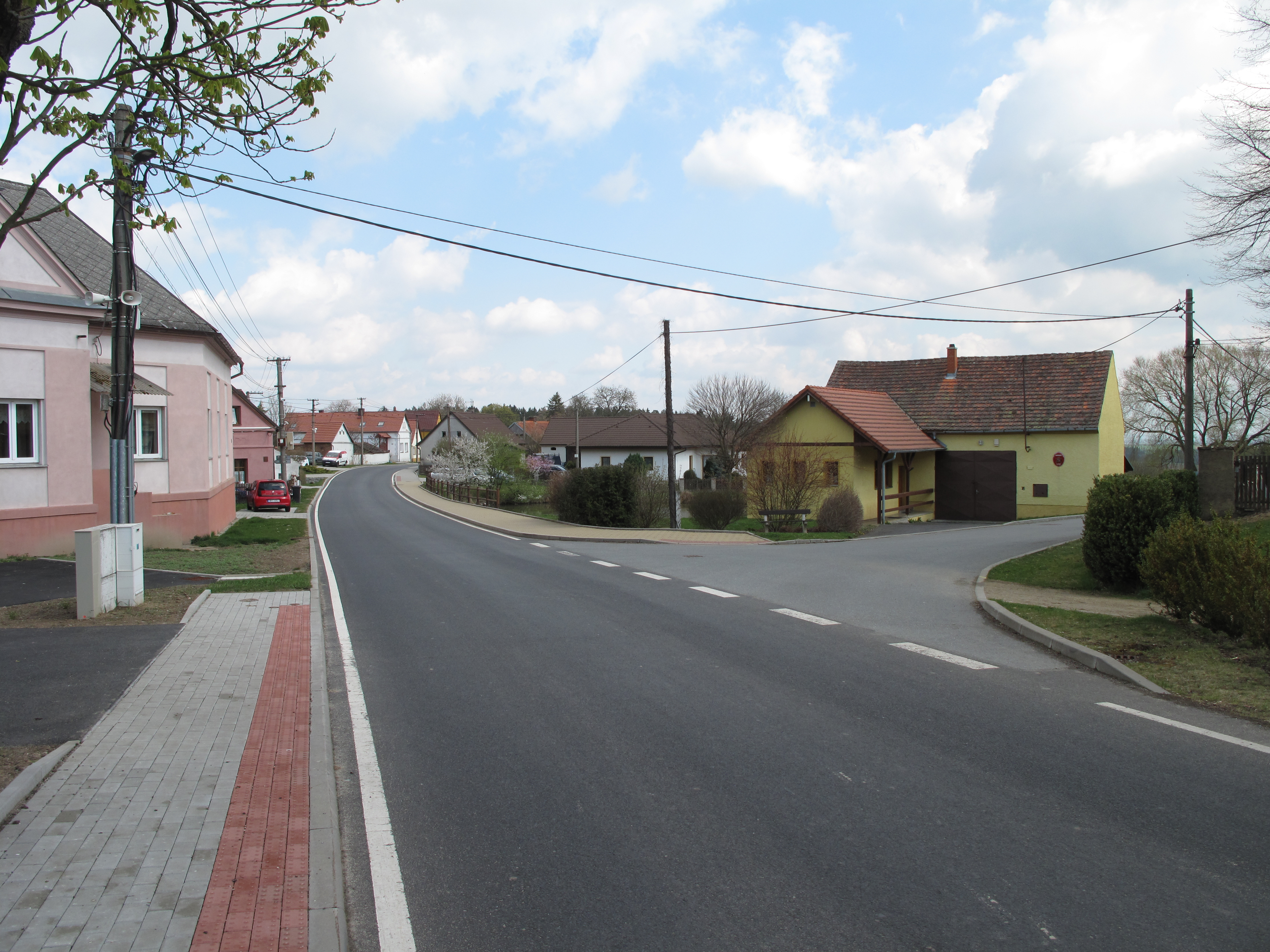
- Main street

- Flag Coat of arms

- Location in the Czech Republic
- Coordinates: 49°40′28″N 13°1′35″E
- Country: Czech Republic
- Region: Plzeň
- District: Tachov
- First mentioned: 1352

Area
  - Total: 30.88 km^{2} (11.92 sq mi)
- Elevation: 482 m (1,581 ft)

Population (2026-01-01)
  - Total: 652
  - Density: 21.1/km^{2} (54.7/sq mi)
- Time zone: UTC+1 (CET)
  - Summer (DST): UTC+2 (CEST)
- Postal code: 330 23, 349 01
- Website: www.obeckostelec.cz

Kostelec (German: Kostelzen) is a municipality and village in Tachov District in the Plzeň Region of the Czech Republic. It has about 700 inhabitants.

Kostelec lies approximately 33 kilometres (21 mi) south-east of Tachov, 27 km (17 mi) west of Plzeň, and 111 km (69 mi) south-west of Prague.

== Administrative division ==
Kostelec consists of six municipal parts (in brackets population according to the 2021 census):

- Kostelec (337)
- Lšelín (16)
- Nedražice (85)
- Ostrov u Stříbra (120)
- Popov (19)
- Vrhaveč (28)

== Demographics ==
Historical population
Year	Pop.	±%
1869	1,367	—
1880	1,432	+4.8%
1890	1,431	−0.1%
1900	1,411	−1.4%
1910	1,451	+2.8%
1921	1,440	−0.8%
1930	1,300	−9.7%
1950	518	−60.2%
1961	588	+13.5%
1970	584	−0.7%
1980	520	−11.0%
1991	474	−8.8%
2001	533	+12.4%
2011	488	−8.4%
2021	605	+24.0%
Source: Censuses
