= History of the Rise, Progress, and Termination of the American Revolution =

1805 book by Mercy Otis Warren

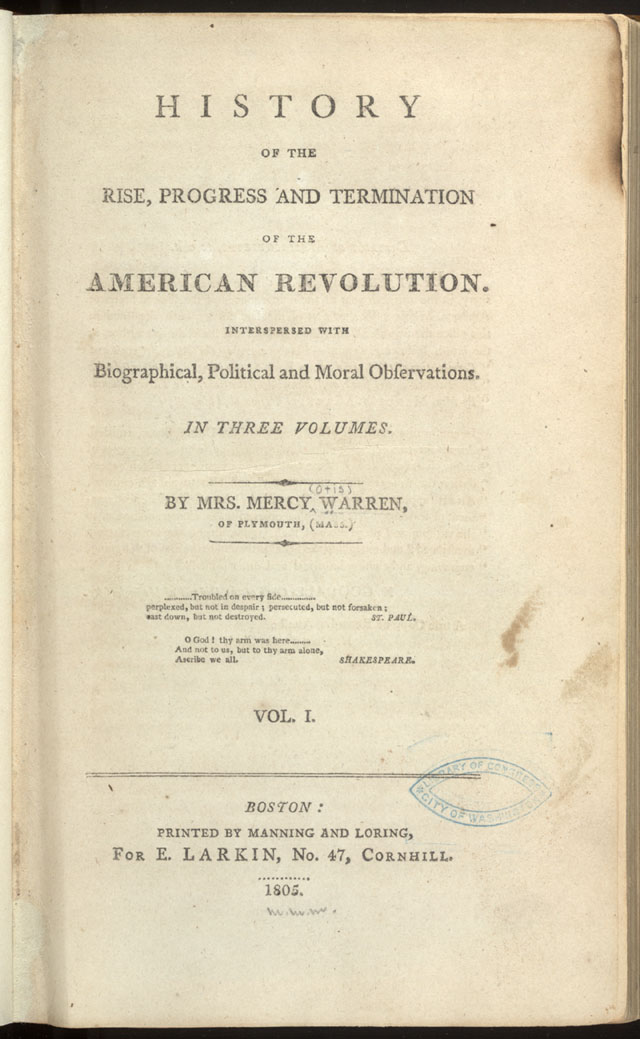
- Note the singeing of the title page.
- Author: Mercy Otis Warren
- Language: English
- Publication date: 1805
- Publication place: United States
- Pages: 1317

History of the Rise, Progress, and Termination of the American Revolution is a book by Mercy Otis Warren. Warren was a correspondent with many political leaders of the American Revolution, including Samuel Adams, John Hancock, Patrick Henry, Thomas Jefferson, and George Washington.

== Background ==
It was published in three volumes, totalling 1,317 pages. Her magnum opus, the book covers the whole Revolutionary period, from the Stamp Act to the events leading to the writing and ratification of the United States Constitution. The book is written in a personal style but, as is many of Warren's works, it is written in the third person. The book contained still-controversial views about the Revolution, including her idea that the Battle of Yorktown, the final battle of the Revolution, was really not a battle at all. Roughly one third of the book concerns events after Yorktown.

Warren wrote drafts of the book during the events as they unfolded and had it published, after four years of additions, in 1805. She credited the delay to health problems, temporary bouts of blindness, and grief at the death of three of her five sons.

An 1851 Christmas Eve fire destroyed almost two thirds of the books that Jefferson had sold to the Library of Congress in 1815. The flames almost claimed the book, as noted by the singeing of the title page.

== Influence ==
President Thomas Jefferson ordered copies of the books for himself and his cabinet and wrote that her account of "the last thirty years will furnish a more instructive lesson to mankind than any equal period known in history."

However, John Adams considered it to be a radical simplification and sometimes a falsification of the true history of the Revolution. After its publication, Adams and Warren exchanged a heated series of letters debating the issue ferociously, especially Adams's part in the Revolution.
