= Matthias Abele =

Austrian jurist (1618–1677)

Matthias Abele von und zu Lilienberg (17 February 1618 – 14 November, 1677) brother of Christoph Ignaz Abele, was a mine official and jurist in Steyr, Austria. He acquired his doctorate in law, was comes palatinus (i.e., an imperial count palatine) and in 1652 member of the Fruchtbringende Gesellschaft (Fruitbearing Society).

He published anecdotes in the style of a court case, namely:

- Metamorphosis telae judiciariae, 1651, 1668, 1712
- Vivat Unordnung!, 1669, 1670-1675
- Fiscologia oder Communitätscasse zu Grillenberg, 1672
