= Abels =

Abels may refer to:

== Mathematics ==
- Abel's test, a mathematical test
- Abel's theorem, a mathematical theorem
- Abel's identity, a mathematical equation
- Abel's inequality, a mathematical parameter

== Other ==
- Abels (surname)
- Abels Shipbuilders, based in Bristol, England
- Abels Moving Services, of Suffolk, England
- Earl Abel's, a restaurant in Texas
- Cains & Abels, an American musical group
- Abel's Island, a children's novel
  - Abel's Island (film), an animated film based on the book
