= Abele (play) =

Play written by Vittorio Alfieri

Abele is an Italian play inspired on the first Bible's chapters by Vittorio Alfieri (1749–1803) which he described as a tramelogedia. It was written in 1786 and first published after Alfieri's death in 1804 in London. The play's characters can be divided in two groups: The first group includes the firsts earth's residents after the creation (Adam, Eva, Cain and Abel) and the second group represents the spiritual beings (God, Beelzebub, Sin, Envy, Death, Angels and Demons).
