= Tony Ables =

American serial killer

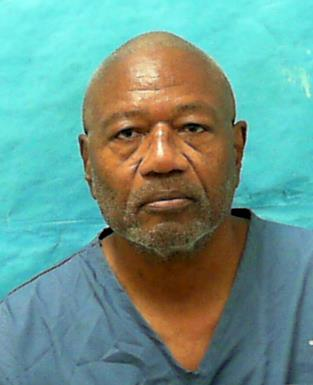
- Inmate mugshot
- Born: Tony Alvin Ables; December 28, 1954 (age 71); St. Petersburg, Florida, U.S.
- Other names: Tony Abels; Thadaisis Gordon; Michael Jones; James Selbe
- Conviction: First degree murder (2 counts)
- Penalty: Life imprisonment

Details
- Victims: 4+ (2 convictions)
- Span of crimes: 1970–1990
- Country: United States
- State: Florida
- Date apprehended: June 4, 1990
- Imprisoned at: Jefferson Correctional Institution

Tony Alvin Ables (born December 28, 1954) is an American serial killer convicted of multiple homicides in the Tampa Bay area. Officially convicted of two murders, he was linked through DNA evidence in 2006 to two additional cases: the 1983 killing of 84-year-old Adeline McLaughlin and the 1987 death of his 31-year-old girlfriend, Deborah Kisor. Despite their romantic involvement, Ables was not charged with killing Kisor, nor has he been tried for McLaughlin's murder. He is currently serving a life sentence for the 1990 murder of another girlfriend, 48-year-old Marlene Burns.

== Murders ==
Tony Alvin Ables, at age 16 in 1970, was involved in a robbery in St. Petersburg, Florida, during which a man was killed. Ables was subsequently arrested and, in March 1971, pleaded guilty to first-degree murder, receiving a life sentence. After serving 12 years in state prison, Ables was released on parole in 1983 and found employment as a construction worker.

Five months after his release, on June 25, 1983, Ables entered the apartment of 83-year-old Adeline McLaughlin, a retired widow from Worcester, Massachusetts, by breaking through a window. McLaughlin was suffocated with a pillow, and her apartment was burglarized. The incident surprised the neighboring tenants, who described McLaughlin as a reserved yet friendly elderly woman.

On February 14, 1987, Deborah Kisor, a 31-year-old woman from Monterey, California, was sexually assaulted and murdered. Kisor was last seen the previous day making a phone call from a payphone in front of an apartment building. A bystander came across her body along a path close to Roser Park Bridge, dressed only in a blouse and jacket. Bruises were observed on her legs, with a pair of blue jeans found beside her body. Although Ables was in a romantic relationship with Kisor at the time, he was not arrested as a suspect in her murder.

On June 4, 1990, Ables was involved in a physical altercation with his girlfriend and roommate, 48-year-old Marlene Burns, which resulted in her death. During the incident, Burns was pushed down the stairs and subsequently beaten and kicked. Witnesses saw Ables leaving the apartment and wiping blood off his hands; they had already called the police to report a domestic dispute when they saw him. When police arrived, they arrested Ables on the spot and later charged him with first-degree murder, holding him without bail at the Pinellas County jail.

== Trial and imprisonment ==
In January 1992, Tony Alvin Ables was convicted of the murder of Marlene Burns. The jury recommended a death sentence in an 8–4 vote, but Judge Bob Barker overrode the recommendation and sentenced Ables to life in prison. The decision was based on Ables's mental health issues. This was supported by testimony from his brother, Anthony, who indicated that their difficult childhood, including abuse by their father that led to their mother's departure from the family, likely contributed to his mental state.

The murders of Adeline McLaughlin and Deborah Kisor remained unsolved until 2006, when homicide detectives submitted Ables' DNA to the Florida Department of Law Enforcement. The DNA matched evidence found on both of their bodies. Although Ables was not charged with Kisor's murder, officials consider the case closed. He was officially booked for McLaughlin's murder but has not yet been charged. According to Police Major Michael Puetz, there is a strong possibility that Ables may be connected to other unsolved crimes.

== See also ==
- List of serial killers in the United States
