= Matthew Abelson =

American musician and percussionist

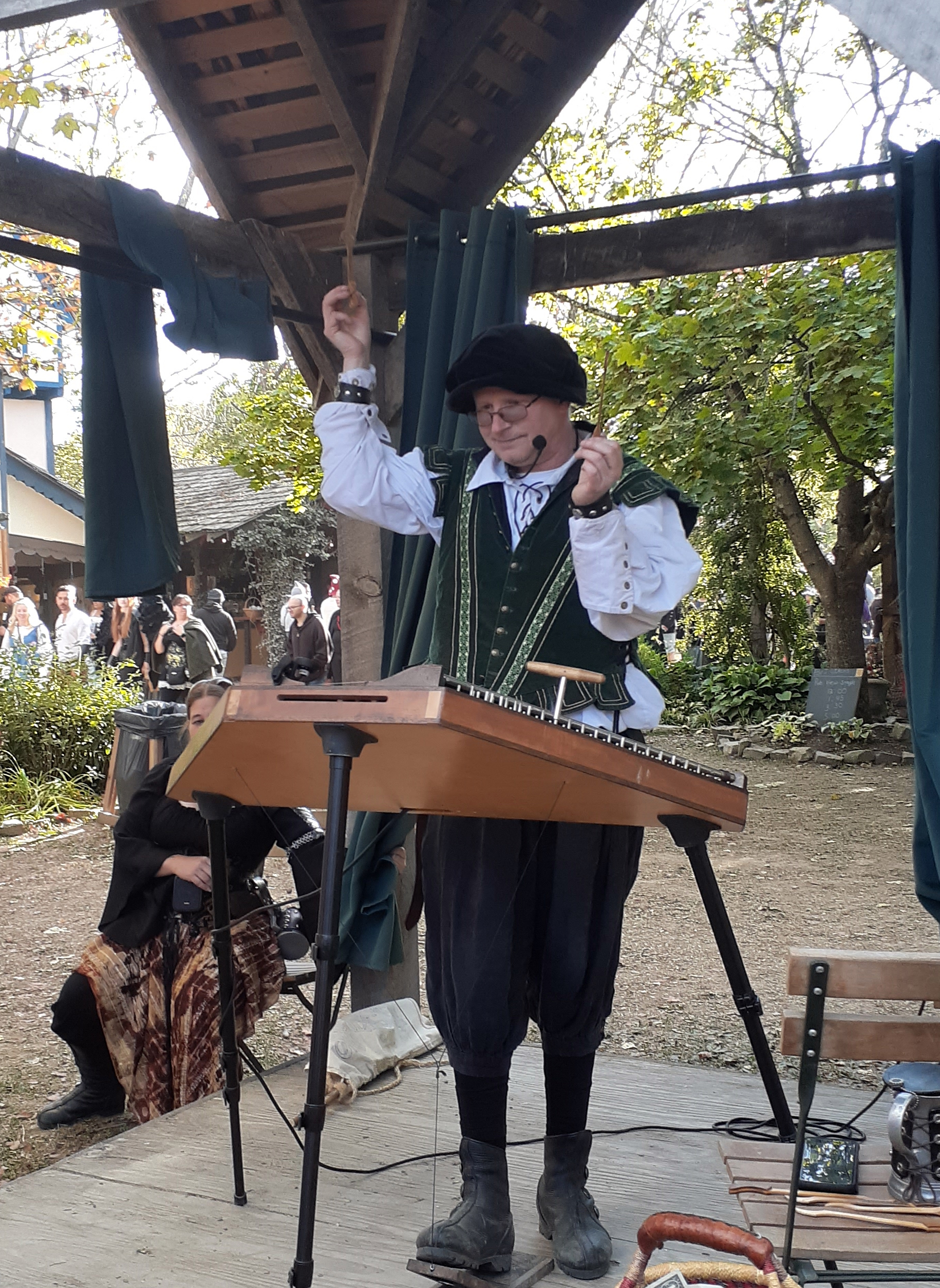
- Matthew Ableson at the 2023 Ohio Renaissance Festival

Background information
- Born: Princeton, New Jersey
- Origin: Ohio
- Occupation: Musician
- Instrument: hammered dulcimer

Matthew Abelson is an American hammered dulcimer player. Originally from Princeton, New Jersey, he lives in Cleveland Heights, Ohio.

In May 1999, Abelson took first place at the Mid-East Regional Hammered Dulcimer Competition.

== Discography ==
- The Flying Dulcimer (Flying Dulcimer Productions)
- 1997 - From Here To There (Flying Dulcimer Productions)
- 2001 - Perspective (with Sam Bush, Vassar Clements, and others) (Flying Dulcimer Productions)
