= Florin Abelès =

French engineer

- Born: October 20, 1922; Galați, Romania
- Died: April 12, 2005 (aged 82); Paris, France
- Education: Ecole Supérieure d'Optique
- Awards: Prix Louis Ancel, CEK Mees Medal from the Optical Society of America
- Scientific career
- Fields: Physics

Florin Abelès (October 20, 1922 – April 12, 2005) was a French physicist who specialized in optics.

In his 1949 doctoral thesis, Abelès developed a transfer-matrix formalism to compute the transmission and reflection of light by thin dielectric layers. When Lyman G. Parratt performed the first x-ray reflectometry experiment in 1954, he developed an equivalent recursion method. Nowadays, Abelès matrices or Parratt recursion are exchangeably used in investigations of multilayers by x-ray reflectometry, neutron reflectometry, or ellipsometry.

In 1969, Abelès founded the journal Optics Communications. He served as editor-in-chief until 1993.
