= Abel Mendoza =

American soccer player (born 2003)

Personal information
- Full name: Abel Mendoza
- Date of birth: January 7, 2003 (age 23)
- Place of birth: Riverside, California, United States
- Height: 5 ft 9 in (1.75 m)
- Position: Midfielder

Team information
- Current team: Utah Valley Wolverines
- Number: 18

Youth career
- Las Vegas Soccer Academy
- 2018–2021: Real Salt Lake

College career
Years	Team	Apps	(Gls)
2022–	Utah Valley Wolverines	8	(1)

Senior career*
Years	Team	Apps	(Gls)
2021	Real Monarchs	1	(0)
- * Club domestic league appearances and goals as of May 16, 2021

Abel Mendoza (born January 7, 2003) is an American soccer player who plays as a midfielder for Utah Valley Wolverines.

== Club career ==
Born in Las Vegas, Nevada, Mendoza began his career with the Las Vegas Soccer Academy before joining the youth academy program of Major League Soccer club Real Salt Lake.

In 2018, he joined Real Salt Lake.

In August 2020, Mendoza and other members of the Real Salt Lake under-19s refused to practice after racist remarks made by the club's owner Dell Loy Hansen.

On May 14, 2021, Mendoza joined Real Salt Lake's affiliate USL Championship squad Real Monarchs, coming on as an 80th-minute substitute in their match against LA Galaxy II.

== International career ==
Mendoza has been called up into the United States U16 side.

== Career statistics ==
=== Club ===
As of match played May 14, 2021

Appearances and goals by club, season and competition
Club	Season	League			National Cup		Continental		Total	
Club	Season	Division	Apps	Goals	Apps	Goals	Apps	Goals	Apps	Goals
Real Monarchs	2021	USL Championship	1	0	—		—		1	0
Career total			1	0	0	0	0	0	1	0
