= John H. Abeles =

American investor

John H. Abeles is an American-based venture investor, director, consultant, entrepreneur, and philanthropist.

He was a director of the International Opera Alliance, New York and was a member of The Players Club, a theatre-themed social club. He also was on the board of the New Group, a theater organization in New York. He served on the advisory board of the College of Chemistry at University of California, Berkeley.

Abeles is the president and founder of MedVest, Inc. He is the managing member of Dalyda Finance LLC. Abeles is the founder, sole investor and general partner of Northlea Partners LLLP. He is chairman of UniMedica Inc.

Abeles is the founder and chairman of BryoLogyx, which licensed a synthetic form of bryostatin-1 from Stanford University for the use in cancer immunotherapy and adjunctive therapy.

Abeles received his medical degree as well as a degree in pharmacology from the University of Birmingham.

Abeles has three children (David, Lynne and Daniel), all successful NYC performing artists in drama and music as well as four granddaughters and two grandsons.
