= Mercy Otis Warren =

American writer (1728–1814)

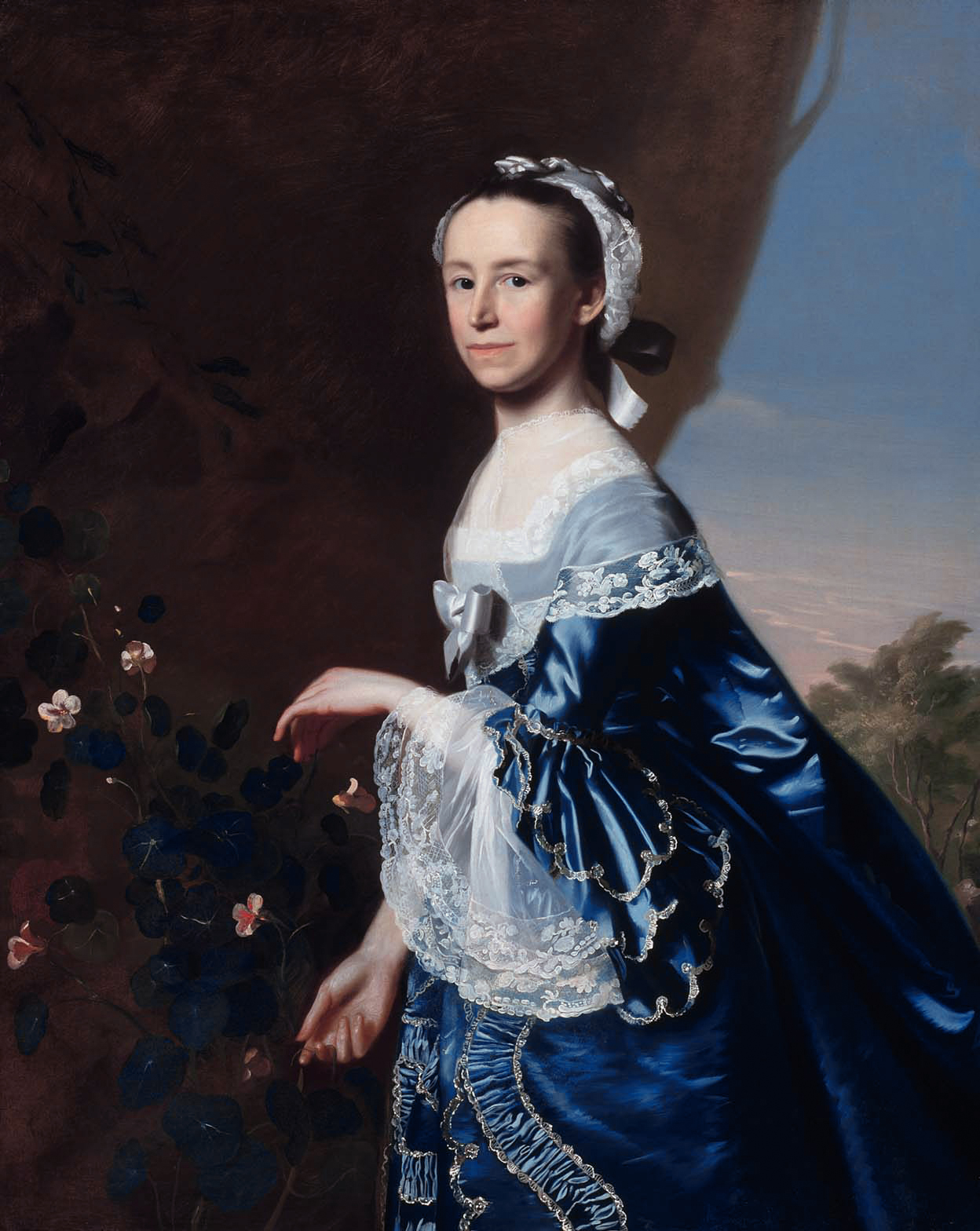
- Warren c. 1763
- Born: Mercy Otis; September 14, 1728; Barnstable, Massachusetts Bay, British America
- Died: October 19, 1814 (aged 86); Massachusetts, U.S.
- Resting place: Burial Hill, Plymouth, U.S. 41.956°N 70.666°W
- Education: Writer (History of the Rise, Progress, and Termination of the American Revolution)
- Occupations: Poet and political writer
- Spouse: James Warren (m. 1754; died 1808)
- Children: 5
- Writing career
- Pen name: A Columbian Patriot
- Language: English

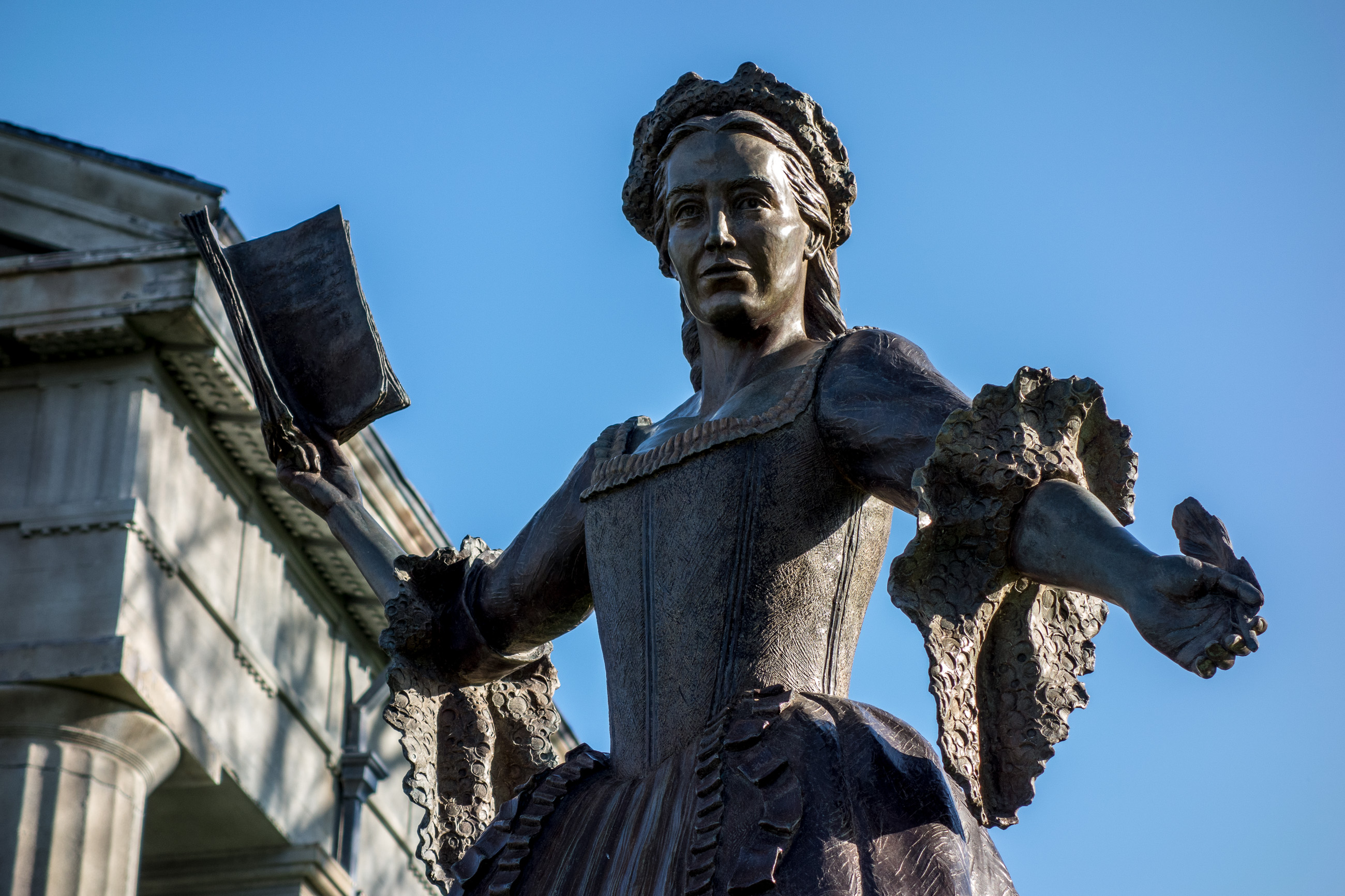
Bronze sculpture of Mercy Otis Warren stands in front of the Barnstable County Courthouse

Mercy Otis Warren (September 14, 1728 – October 19, 1814) was an American activist poet, playwright, and pamphleteer during the American Revolution. During the years before the Revolution, she had published poems and plays that attacked royal authority in Massachusetts and urged colonists to resist British infringements on colonial rights and liberties. Her husband, James Warren, was likewise heavily active in the independence movement.

During the debate over the United States Constitution in 1788, Warren issued a pamphlet, Observations on the New Constitution, and on the Federal and State Conventions, written under the pseudonym "A Columbian Patriot", that opposed ratification of the document and advocated the inclusion of a Bill of Rights. Observations was long thought to be the work of other writers, most notably Elbridge Gerry. It was not until one of her descendants, Charles Warren, found a reference to it in a 1787 letter to British historian Catharine Macaulay that Warren was credited with authorship. In 1790, Warren published a collection of poems and plays under her own name, an unusual occurrence for a woman at the time. In 1805, Warren published one of the earliest histories of the American Revolution, a three-volume History of the Rise, Progress, and Termination of the American Revolution.

== Early life ==
Warren was born on September 14, 1728, (Note: Her date of birth is September 25, 1728, on today's calendar. It was September 14, 1728, on the Old Style calendar.) the third of 13 children and the first daughter of Colonel James Otis (1702–1778) and Mary (Allyne) Otis (1702–1774). The family lived in Barnstable, Massachusetts. Mary was a descendant of Mayflower passenger Edward Doty. James was a farmer and attorney who served as a judge for the Barnstable County Court of Common Pleas. He won election to the Massachusetts House of Representatives in 1745. James was an outspoken opponent of British rule and the appointed colonial governor, Thomas Hutchinson.

The Otis children were "raised in the midst of revolutionary ideals". Although Mercy had no formal education, she studied with the Reverend Jonathan Russell while he tutored her brothers, Joseph and James, in preparation for college. Her father also had unconventional views of his daughter's education, as he fully supported her endeavors, which was extremely unusual for the 18th century. Her brother James attended Harvard College and became a noted patriot and lawyer. What little of his correspondence with Mercy survives suggests that James encouraged Mercy's academic and literary efforts, treating her as an intellectual equal and confidante.

== Marriage and children ==
Mercy Otis married her second cousin, James Warren, on November 14, 1754. After settling in Plymouth, James inherited his father's position as sheriff. His previous occupations included farming and working as a merchant. Throughout their lives, they wrote letters of respect and admiration to each other. These exchanges of adoration showed both a mutual respect and an enduring bond between the two. James would write from Boston, "I have read one Excellent Sermon this day & heard two others. What next can I do better than write to a Saint," and Mercy would then respond, "Your spirit I admire - were a few thousands on the Continent of a similar disposition we might defy the power of Britain." They had five sons: James (1757–1821), Winslow (1759–1791), Charles (1762–1784), Henry (1764–1828), and George (1766–1800).

James Warren had a distinguished political career. In 1766, he was elected to the Massachusetts House of Representatives. James became speaker of the House and president of the Massachusetts Provincial Congress. He also served as paymaster to George Washington's army for a time during the American Revolutionary War.

Their Plymouth home was often a meeting place for local politics and revolutionaries including the Sons of Liberty. Warren became increasingly drawn to political activism, and she hosted protest meetings in her home. These meetings laid the foundation for the Committees of correspondence. Warren wrote, "Perhaps no single step contributed so much to cement the union of the colonies, and the final acquisition of independence, as the establishment of committees of correspondence."

Warren wrote: "Every domestic enjoyment depends on the unimpaired possession of civil and religious liberty." Her husband encouraged her to write, fondly referring to her as the "scribbler", and Warren became his chief correspondent and sounding board.

== Revolutionary writings and politics ==
Warren formed a strong circle of friends with whom she regularly corresponded, including Abigail Adams, John Adams, Martha Washington, and Hannah Winthrop, wife of John Winthrop. In a letter to Catharine Macaulay, Warren wrote: "America stands armed with resolution and virtue; but she still recoils at the idea of drawing the sword against the nation from whom she derived her origin. Yet Britain, like an unnatural parent, is ready to plunge her dagger into the bosom of her affectionate offspring."

Warren became a correspondent and advisor to many political leaders, including Washington, Samuel Adams, John Hancock, Patrick Henry, Thomas Jefferson, and especially John Adams, who became her literary mentor in the years leading to the Revolution. In a letter to James Warren, Adams writes, "Tell your wife that God Almighty has entrusted her with the Powers for the good of the World, which, in the cause of his Providence, he bestows on few of the human race. That instead of being a fault to use them, it would be criminal to neglect them."

Warren had already become acquainted with John Adams's cousin, Samuel, as he was a frequent visitor. Adams himself had suggested the basic content of the poem, while his request that Warren write was probably due to Warren's close friendship with his wife, Abigail. Unsure of how her writing would be received, Warren consulted with her friend Abigail Adams about John Adams' opinion of her work. John Adams was pleased with the anonymous poem and published it on the front page of the Boston Gazette. It was also Adams who had urged her to write a history of the Revolution even while the war was still being fought. For this work, she was able to use her memory of the Revolution, but she solicited copies of congressional debates, letters, and other information from the active participants in the revolution, many of whom she knew personally.

Before and during the Revolution, the Warren home served as a gathering place for patriot debates and meetings, allowing Mercy Warren to meet patriot leaders and their wives. Her husband, James, was also on the Massachusetts Committee of Correspondence and, among other official positions, served as the paymaster of the Continental Army in 1776, a time when Mercy Warren would travel between home and the army to serve as her husband's secretary. Her elite and privileged status amid such a dramatically evolving political situation allowed her, as a woman, entry into the inner circles of revolutionary activity and debate. Not only did she come to know as individuals many of the most important political figures of her times, but she also formed strong opinions about many of them and some, like Adams, became influential in her literary life. Among those she met was George Washington, whom she described from their first meeting as "one of the most amiable and accomplished gentlemen, both in person, mind, and manners...." Years later, in 1790, she would ask Washington to approve her History, which he did. Another friend, Jefferson, helped her get subscriptions for this work. This same creation also contributed to the bitterness that rose between Warren and John Adams. After the Revolution, Mercy sided with Jeffersonian Republicanism. She openly expressed her opinion in the harshest of terms in her historical account of Adams, ending one of the most productive friendships of the revolutionary period. As with John Adams, John Hancock, who had once wavered about the question of independence from Britain, also fell out of favor with the Warrens.

Warren wrote several plays, including the satiric The Adulateur (1772). Directed against Governor Thomas Hutchinson of Massachusetts, The Adulateur foretold the American Revolution. It was published as a part of a longer play by an unknown author without Warren's consent in 1773. One of the main characters in Warren's part of the play is "Rapatio", who represented Hutchinson. Because Warren was a Whig and Hutchinson was a Tory, Warren disagreed with Hutchinson's views. Therefore, Rapatio is the antagonist in The Adulateur. The protagonist is "Brutus", whom Warren created to represent her brother, James Otis. In the play, the characters who are Whigs are brave, independent people, while the characters who are Tories are selfish and rude. The play includes a happy ending for the Whigs. After the play was published, Hutchinson became known as Rapatio to citizens of Massachusetts who identified with the Whigs. Because her first play was so successful and she thoroughly enjoyed writing about politics, Warren did not stop there.

In 1773, Warren wrote The Defeat, also featuring a character based on Hutchinson. Hutchinson had no idea of the accuracy of her plot nor completely comprehended the impact she made on his political fate. Warren's assistance in the movement to remove Governor Hutchinson from his position through The Defeat was one of her greatest accomplishments, and she allowed the piece a rare happy ending. Warren began to doubt as she wrote the third installment in her trilogy, feeling the power of her satire compromised her divine purpose to be a "member of the gentler sex," but she found encouragement from Abigail Adams, who told her, "God Almighty has entrusted [you] with Powers for the good of the World". With this affirmation, Warren then provided her sharpest political commentary yet: in 1775 Warren published The Group, a satire conjecturing what would happen if the British king abrogated the Massachusetts charter of rights. The anonymously published The Blockheads (1776) and The Motley Assembly (1779) are also attributed to her. In 1788, she published Observations on the New Constitution, whose ratification she opposed as an Anti-Federalist.

Warren was one of the most convincing Patriots in the Revolution and her works inspired others to become Patriots. Her work earned the congratulations of numerous prominent men of the age, including George Washington and Alexander Hamilton, who remarked, "In the career of dramatic composition at least, female genius in the United States has outstripped the male".

== Post-Revolutionary writings and politics ==
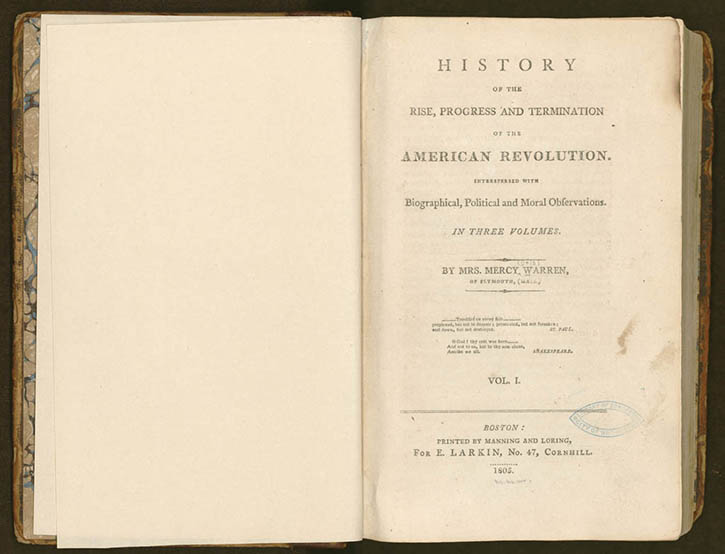
History of the Rise, Progress and Termination of the American Revolution (1805)

All of Warren's works were published anonymously until 1790 when she published Poems, Dramatic and Miscellaneous, the first work bearing her name. The book contains eighteen political poems and two plays. The two plays, called "The Sack of Rome" and "The Ladies of Castille," deal with liberty as well as social and moral values that were necessary to the success of the new republic.

In 1805, she completed her literary career with a three-volume History of the Rise, Progress, and Termination of the American Revolution. President Thomas Jefferson ordered subscriptions for himself and his cabinet and noted his "anticipation of her truthful account of the last thirty years that will furnish a more instructive lesson to mankind than any equal period known in history." Additionally, biographer Martha J. King notes that the work is "considered one of the few great comprehensive histories of the Revolution and formative years of the Republic written by a contemporary." The book's sharp comments on John Adams led to a heated correspondence and a breach in her friendship with Adams, which lasted until 1812. In response to the book Adams fumed in a letter to a mutual friend "History is not the province of the ladies."

== Death and legacy ==
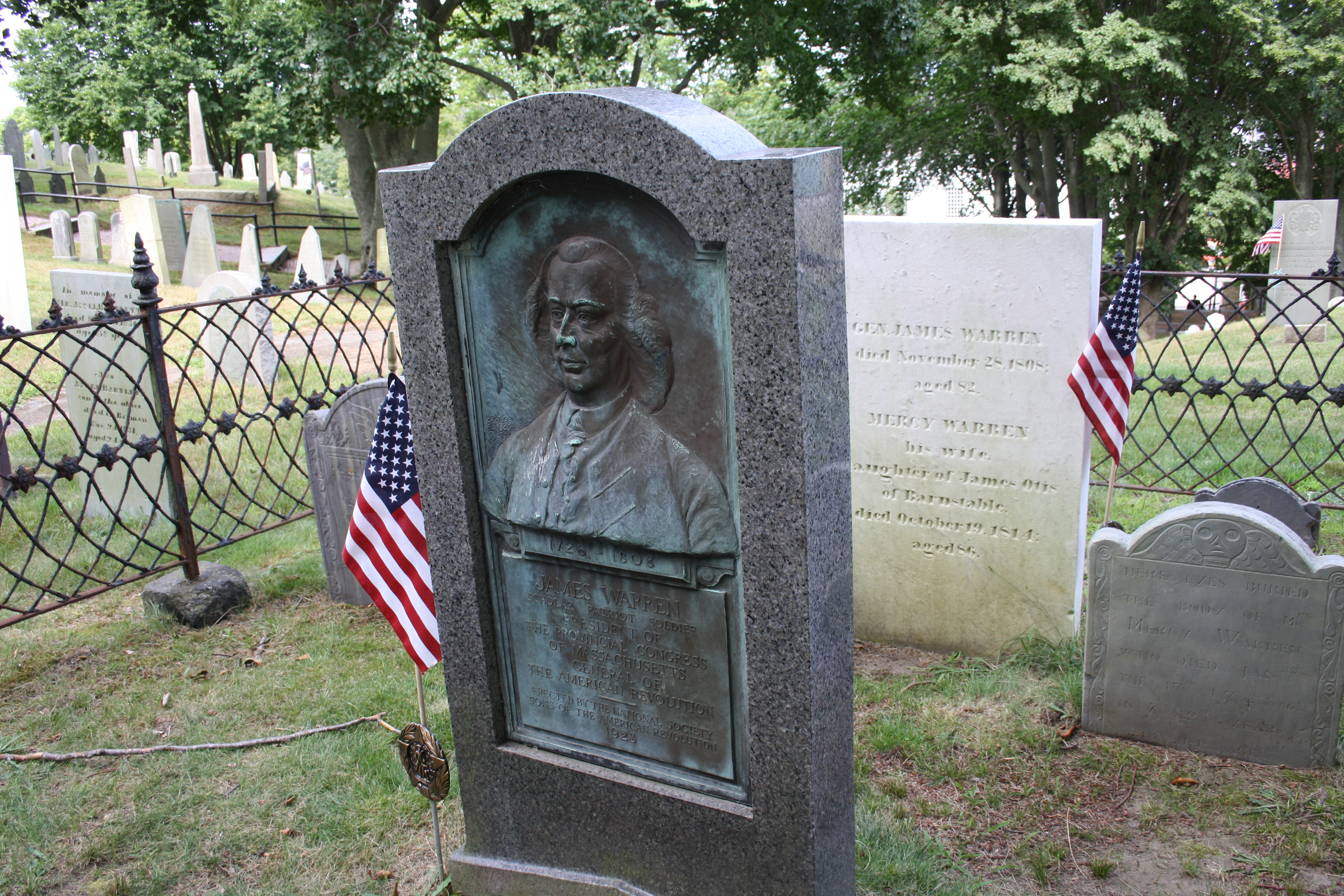
Mercy Otis Warren's gravestone is located directly behind James Warren's plaque. She is buried alongside her husband at Burial Hill.

Warren died on October 19, 1814, at age 86, six years after her husband died. She is buried at Burial Hill in Plymouth, Massachusetts.

Although at first dubious about the proper role of women as propagandists, she succumbed to the urgings of her friends and accepted her duty to use her talents for the patriot cause. Her interest in current events blossomed into the skills of a self-taught historian, with a romanticized style of the sort readers of contemporary literature expected. Like the fiction of the day, her historiography pointed toward moral lessons, and her plays and histories reflected her partisanship against the faction around Governor Hutchinson, or the Hamiltonian Federalists in the national capital. Historians no longer read her for factual details, but they do find her a valuable source on the mood among intellectuals in the Revolutionary era and the early nation. Feminists debate whether she could be considered one of them, for her expressed approach was traditional, with some impatience shown at the restraints. Warren did strongly encourage women writers while stressing the cheerful performance of household duties.

Warren proved her ability to resonate with her colonial audience, both men and women. She was willing to put forth work calling out the authoritative power while raising a family but was humble and practical in how she presented the commentary through quieter presentations. Warren told her son George, "The thorns, the thistles, and the briers, in the field of politics seldom permit the soil to produce anything... but ruin to the adventurer", yet the public would not let her retire from commenting on the political conflicts of her later days.

The SS Mercy Warren, a World War II Liberty ship launched in 1943, was named in her honor. In 2002, Warren was inducted into the National Women's Hall of Fame in Seneca Falls, New York. She is remembered on the Boston Women's Heritage Trail. Warren's great-great-grandson, Charles Warren, became a distinguished lawyer and historian.

== Bibliography ==
- 1772 - Adulateur
- 1773 - The Defeat
- 1776 - The Blockheads
- 1779 - The Motley Assembly
- 1788 - Observations on the New Constitution
- 1790 - Poems, Dramatic and Miscellaneous
- 1805 - History of the Rise, Progress, and Termination of the American Revolution

== Sources ==
- Anthony, Katharine (1958). First Lady of the Revolution: The Life of Mercy Otis Warren. Doubleday & Company. pp. 86–87.
- Gerlach, Murney (2004). "Warren, James (1726–1808)". Oxford Dictionary of National Biography (online ed.). Oxford University Press. doi:10.1093/ref:odnb/68768. (Subscription, Wikipedia Library access or UK public library membership required.)
- Gillis, Jennifer Blizin (2005). Mercy Otis Warren: Author and Historian. Compass Point Books. ISBN 978-0-7565-0982-8.
- King, Martha J. (2011). "The 'pen of the historian': Mercy Otis Warren's History of the American Revolution". The Princeton University Library Chronicle. 72 (2): 513–532. doi:10.25290/prinunivlibrchro.72.2.0513. ISSN 0032-8456. JSTOR 10.25290/prinunivlibrchro.72.2.0513.
- Richards, Jeffrey H. (1995). Mercy Otis Warren. New York : Twayne Publishers; London : Prentice Hall International. ISBN 978-0-8057-4003-5. (Reviewed in William and Mary Quarterly 1997 54(3): 659–361, JSTOR 2953865 by Jacqueline S. Reinier.)
- Rodenbough, Theophilus Francis; Haskin, William Lawrence (2015) [1896]. The Army Of The United States: Historical Sketches Of Staff And Line With Portraits Of Generals-in-chief. Arkose Press. ISBN 978-1-3441-3256-5.
- Zagarri, Rosemarie (2015). A Woman's Dilemma : Mercy Otis Warren and the American Revolution. Hoboken : John Wiley & Sons Inc. ISBN 978-1-118-98113-9.
