= Hope Abelson =

American theater producer and philanthropist (1910–2006)

Hope Abelson, (née Hope Altman, September 21, 1910 – September 1, 2006) was an American theatre producer and philanthropist. She spent her childhood and career devoted to the arts, first as an artist, and later as a producer and arts philanthropist. Notably, Abelson helped fund the burgeoning theatre scene in Chicago through support of institutions like Victory Gardens Theater, Steppenwolf Theatre Company, and Court Theatre (Chicago).

Abelson had two children with husband Lester Abelson, Stuart and Katherine. She died in 2006, and her estate funds the Lester and Hope Abelson Fund for the Performing Arts.

== Early life ==
Abelson was born Hope Altman on September 21, 1910, in Chicago, Illinois. As a teenager, Abelson studied dance, and she studied theatre at Northwestern University. She found work on radio dramas, soap operas, and other Chicago-based productions. In 1933, Abelson married Lester Abelson, a Chicago businessman. They had two children, Stuart and Katherine.

During World War II, Abelson was the director of the Red Cross Speaker's Bureau, petitioning the public to donate blood and contribute to the war effort. She also helped book local and touring acts to perform at military hospitals.

== Theatre ==
After the war, Abelson got more involved in the Chicago theatre community. She helped establish the Chevy Chase Theatre in Wheeling, Illinois in 1949, and worked with the Music Theater in Highland Park, Illinois from 1950 to 1952. In 1952, Abelson met producer Cheryl Crawford. In 1953, Crawford hired Abelson to work on the premiere production of Tennessee Williams' "Camino Real," directed by Elia Kazan. In 1954, she produced The Rainmaker (play) on Broadway. Abelson continued to work on New York productions for the next 15 years, splitting her time between New York and Glencoe, Illinois. She worked as staff on Off-Broadway productions and Broadway theatre productions, and as an independent producer. In the 1960s, she helped open the Vivian Beaumont Theater at New York's Lincoln Center.

== Philanthropy ==
Abelson did not like to be called a philanthropist. But after her husband died in 1980, leaving behind wealth from his liquor business, Abelson financially supported many theaters and causes. She supported the American Cancer Society, as well as a number of storefront theaters. Abelson is responsible for the Lester and Hope Abelson Fund for the Performing Arts through the Chicago Community Trust.

The mainstage auditorium at the Court Theatre is named for Abelson, as well as the Lester and Hope Abelson Fund for New Artistic Initiatives at the Goodman Theatre. Northwestern University hosts a Hope Abelson Artist-in-Residence. The Chicago Symphony Orchestra created the Hope Abelson Artistic Initiative Fund.

The Chicago Tribune described Abelson as "the grande dame of [Chicago's] non-profit theater movement."
