= Abelian =

Abelian may refer to:

== Mathematics ==
=== Group theory ===
- Abelian group, a group in which the binary operation is commutative
  - Category of abelian groups (Ab), has abelian groups as objects and group homomorphisms as morphisms
- Metabelian group, a group where the commutator subgroup is abelian
- Abelianisation

=== Topology and number theory ===
- Abelian variety, a complex torus that can be embedded into projective space
- Abelian surface, a two-dimensional abelian variety
- Abelian function, a meromorphic function on an abelian variety
- Abelian integral, a function related to the indefinite integral of a differential of the first kind

=== Other mathematics ===
- Abelian category, in category theory, a preabelian category in which every monomorphism is a kernel and every epimorphism is a cokernel
- Abelian and Tauberian theorems, in real analysis, used in the summation of divergent series
- Abelian extension, in Galois theory, a field extension for which the associated Galois group is abelian
- Abelian von Neumann algebra, in functional analysis, a von Neumann algebra of operators on a Hilbert space in which all elements commute

== Other uses ==
- Abelian, in physics, a gauge theory with a commutative symmetry group
- Hovhannes Abelian (1865–1936), Armenian actor
- Movses Abelian, Armenian diplomat

== See also ==
- Pre-abelian category, an additive category that has all kernels and cokernels
- Niels Henrik Abel (1802–1829), Norwegian mathematician who gave his name to several different mathematical concepts
- Abelians, a 4th-century Christian sect
  - Abel, a Biblical figure in the Book of Genesis
