= Avila (duo) =

Avila is a duo made up of the singer-songwriter Brie Stoner of Grand Rapids, Michigan, and Daniel Johnson of Detroit. In November 2012, they released a three-song EP titled Curtains which included their cover version of "My Favorite Things" (from The Sound of Music), which was soon picked for use in a commercial by the Victoria's Secret lingerie company.

Their cover version of "All Shook Up" was used in a commercial for Trojan Lubricants.
