= Abelians =

Christian sect

Abelians (Latin: Abelonii; also Abelites, Abelonites, Abelonians, or Abenonitae) were a Christian sect that emerged in the 4th century in the countryside near Hippo Regius in north Africa during the reign of Arcadius. They lived in continence as they affirmed Abel did. They were required to be married but were forbidden to consummate the marriage. Each couple was required to adopt two children, a boy and a girl. When their adoptive parents died, these adoptees would then form a couple and adopt further two children. Because no children of Abel are mentioned in Scripture, the Abelians assumed that he had none. This view was influenced by Jewish, and Manichean-inspired Gnostic perspectives on Abel that recognized that, while he was married, he remained a virgin. The only record of the sect is in Augustine of Hippo's De Haereticis ch. 87, where he writes that the name of the sect is probably of Punic origin. According to Augustine, the sect became extinct in 428 when its last members converted to Catholicism.
