= Ables, Texas =

Ghost town in Texas, US

Ables
- Ghost town
- Location in Texas
- Coordinates: 31.77917600°N 104.94167200°W
- Country: United States
- State: Texas
- County: Hudspeth
- Elevation: 256 ft (78 m)
- USGS Feature ID: 1381362

Ables is a ghost town in Hudspeth County, Texas, United States. It was founded before 1909, by W. S. Ables, who is also the namesake. A post office operated from its founding in 1909, until 1941, when it was consolidated by Salt Flat. It was abandoned by the end of the 1940s.
