= Norman Abeles =

Austrian-born psychologist (born 1928)

- Born: April 15, 1928 (age 98); Vienna, Austria
- Education: New York University; The University of Texas at Austin
- Scientific career
- Fields: Psychology
- Institutions: Michigan State University

Norman Abeles (born April 15, 1928) is an Austrian-born psychologist. He is a university professor and a former president of the American Psychological Association.

== Biography ==
Abeles was born in 1928 in Vienna, Austria. He earned an undergraduate degree from New York University and a PhD from The University of Texas at Austin. He was the 1997 president of the American Psychological Association (APA). Abeles is an emeritus professor of psychology at Michigan State University (MSU). He is the former director of MSU's psychological clinic. Much of Abeles's work has centered on aging. He is on the editorial board of Alzheimer's Disease and Related Dementias.

Abeles has been named a fellow of several APA divisions and was named to the APA Council of Representatives for the period between 2012 and 2014. While the president of the APA, he helped to form the organization's Office of Aging in 1997. He has participated twice in the White House Conference on Aging that is held every ten years.
