= Christoph Ignaz Abele =

Austrian jurist (1628–1685)

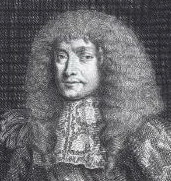
Engraving of Christoph Ignaz Abele by Cornelis Meyssens.

Christoph Ignaz Abele, von und zu Lilienberg (1628, in Vienna – 12 October 1685, in Vienna), son of a Swabian family, was an Austrian jurist and court official.

== Biography ==
First records of the Abele family first appear at the court of Maximilian I, Elector of Bavaria, where a member is listed in the court service. In 1547, the Abeles were awarded a nobility title and tenures in Lower Austria and Steiermark. The good reputation of the Abeles is linked primarily to Christoph Ignaz, who earned a name and a career in the higher civil service of Austria at the same time as Johann Hocher, Freiherr von Hohenkrän, and his brother Matthias Abele.

Abele was awarded the title von und zu Lilienberg, Erbherr auf Hacking on 5 November 1655 by Leopold I, Holy Roman Emperor. He became imperial secretary and was in charge of important transactions. In 1667-1670, he took a principal place in the fact-finding committee at the process against the Hungarian magnate conspiracy. In 1674 he was incorporated in the "old" nobility.

Abele kept a large influence on the Privy Conferencial or Ministerial Council. The fall of George Louis, Count of Sinzendorf in 1679 procured him the directorate of the Hofkammer (Court Chamber). At the same time, he was awarded the title of baron. Two years later he became a lord, and acquired the post of Privy Council. In 1683, Abele resigned the presidency of the Hofkammer but remained member of the Council.

In 1684 he earned the title of count and acts as commissar at the Hungarian royal court, but dies soon thereafter.

== Publications ==
Christoph Ignaz Abele also published some juridical historical tracts, namely:

- Kurze doch wahrhaffte in jure et facto wohlbegründete Gegen Deduction der österreichischen Jurium wider die von dem löblichen fürstlichen Stifft Bamberg auff gegenwärtigem Reichstag zu Regenspurg abgegebene Informations Schrifft: Specimen facti etc. (sic), 1668, 12 pages folio

== Sources ==
- Allgemeine Deutsche Biographie - online version at Wikisource
