= USNS Able =

1991 Victorious-class ocean survey ship

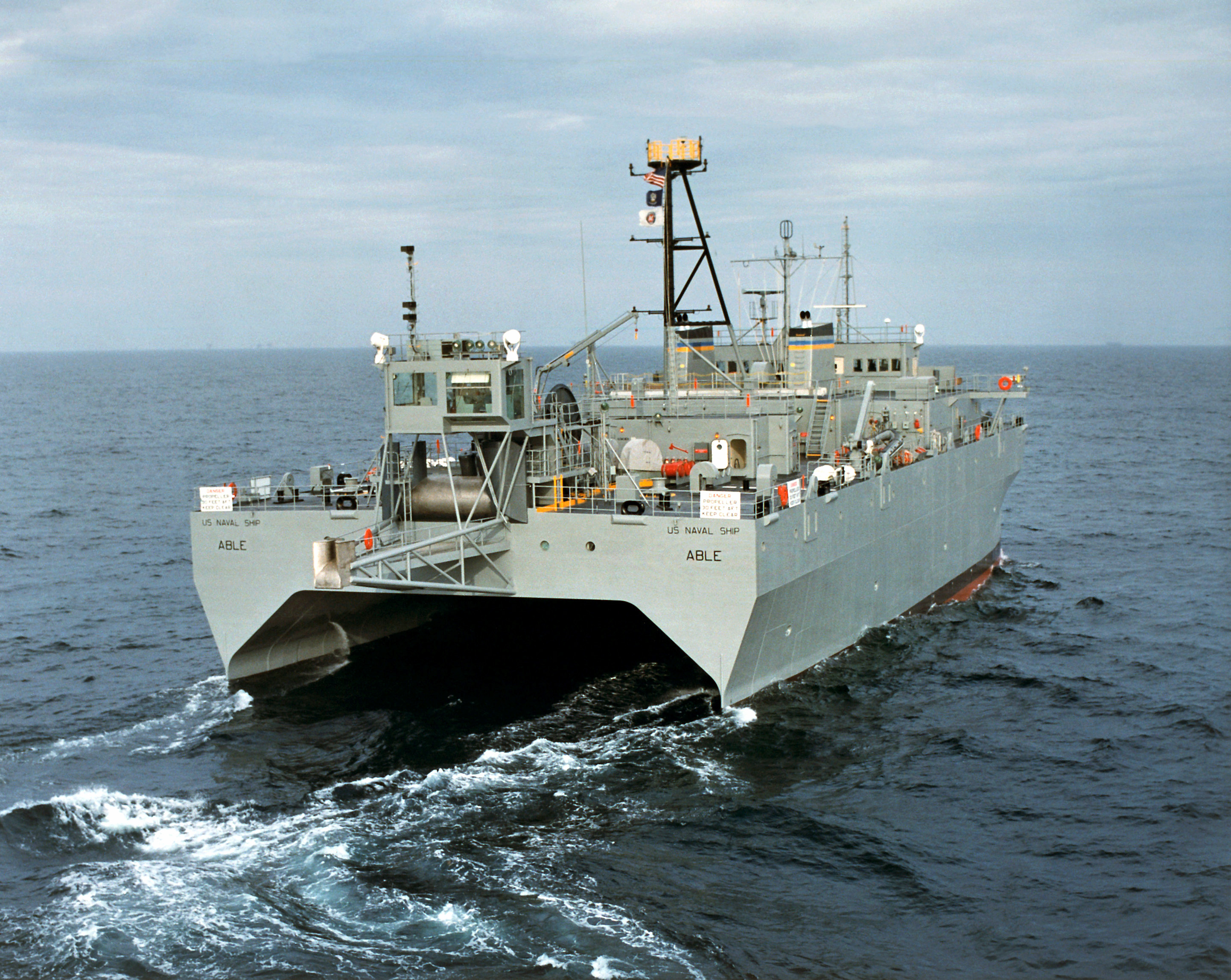

History

United States
- Name: Able
- Operator: Military Sealift Command (MSC)
- Builder: McDermott Shipyard, Morgan City, Louisiana
- Laid down: 23 March 1989
- Launched: 16 February 1991
- Acquired: 22 July 1992
- Identification: IMO number: 8923143; MMSI number: 367837000; Callsign: NABL
- Status: re-activated

General characteristics
- Class & type: Victorious-class survey ship
- Displacement: 3,100 long tons (3,100 t) (light); 3,384 long tons (3,438 t) (full load)
- Length: 235 ft (72 m)
- Beam: 94 ft (29 m)
- Draft: 25 ft (7.6 m)
- Installed power: 1,600 hp (1,200 kW)
- Propulsion: 2 × diesel-electric engines 2 × shafts
- Speed: 10 kn (19 km/h; 12 mph)
- Complement: 15 navy personnel; 19–22 civilian mariners; 5 technicians
- Sensors & processing systems: SURTASS passive and low frequency active-array
- Armament: none

USNS Able (T-AGOS-20) is a Victorious-class oceanographic survey ship in the service of the United States Navy's Military Sealift Command.

== Construction ==
Able was laid down on 23 March 1989, at McDermott Shipyard, in Morgan City, Louisiana. Launched on 16 February 1991; sponsored by Mrs. Dorothy E. Thompson, wife of Rear Adm. William Thompson (Ret.); and placed in service with the Military Sealift Command (MSC) on 22 July 1992.

Able is an MSC-crewed ocean surveillance ship that uses surveillance towed-array sensor system equipment to gather underwater acoustical data. The command operates the ship as part of its Special Mission Ships Program, using her to support the antisubmarine warfare mission of the commanders of the Atlantic and Pacific Fleets. In addition, Able carries electronic equipment to process and transmit that data via satellites to shore stations for evaluation. She is built on a small-waterplane, twin-hull design for greater stability at slow speeds in high latitudes under adverse weather conditions. She deploys primarily to the Western Pacific.

In August 2004, Able was taken out of service and laid up in the Reserve Fleet at the Naval Sea Systems Command's Inactive Ships On-site Maintenance Office at Philadelphia, Pennsylvania. The service reactivated the ship in 2007, and transferred her to a commercial shipyard in Charleston, South Carolina, where she was converted for AN/UQQ-2 Surveillance Towed Array Sensor System (SURTASS) low frequency active-array capabilities. Able completed her conversion and reactivation the following year after steaming to the West Coast, and then deployed again to the Western Pacific.

== Bibliography ==
Online resources

- Evans, Mark L. (3 November 2015). "Able (T-AGOS-20) 1992–". Dictionary of American Naval Fighting Ships. Naval History and Heritage Command. This article incorporates text from this source, which is in the public domain.
- "USNS Able (T-AGOS-20)". NavSource. 10 February 2017.
