= Abel Xavier Nzuzi Lubota =

Angolan politician

Abel Xavier Nzuzi Lubota is an Angolan politician for the CASA–CE and a member of the National Assembly of Angola.
