= Saint Abel (disambiguation) =

Saint Abel of Reims (died 764) was abbot of Lobbes and Bishop of Reims.

Saint Abel is also the name of:

- Saint Abel (Syrian), saint of the Syrian Church, considered patron saint of the blind and the lame
- Abel of Tacla Haimonot, saint of the Abyssinian Church
