= Kim Abeles =

American artist and academic (born 1952)

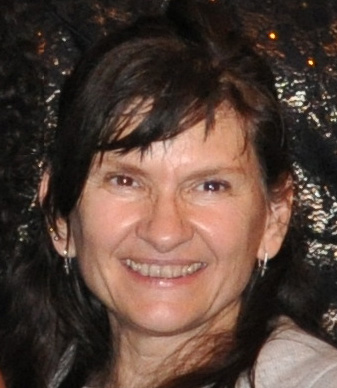
- Born: Kim Victoria Wright; August 28, 1952; Richmond Heights, Missouri, U.S.A.
- Education: Ohio University, University of California, Irvine
- Known for: American interdisciplinary artist
- Movement: Contemporary Social and Environmental Issues
- Awards: National and International Acclaim for her 1987 Exhibit Smog Collectors
- Website: kimabeles.com

Kim Victoria Abeles (born August 28, 1952) is an American interdisciplinary artist and professor emeritus. She was born in Richmond Heights, Missouri, and currently lives in Los Angeles. She is described as an activist artist because of her work's social and political nature. In her work, she’s able to express these issues and shine a light on them to larger audiences. She’s able to show the significance of the issues by creating a piece that involves an object and adds the struggle attached to it, which represents what is happening in current events. She is also known for her feminist works. Abeles has exhibited her works in 22 countries and has received a number of significant awards including a Guggenheim Fellowship. Aside from her work as an artist, she was a professor in public art, sculpture, and drawing at California State University, Northridge from 1998 to 2009, after which she became professor emerita in 2010.

== Early life and education ==
Kim Victoria Abeles was born in Richmond Heights, Missouri. As a child, she spent some time living in Pittsburgh, Pennsylvania, an experience which she says influenced her work The Smog Collector.

Kim Abele's main influences for her sculptures and installations stem from the urban world and historical and contemporary issues. She focuses on this because she had her childhood in the known "steel town" of Pittsburgh. In addition, she moved to smoggy Los Angeles in 1978. Then in 1980, sweatshops started to pop up around her Los Angeles studio. By seeing all this, she wanted to take an approach to her art that was more about "real life." She has stated she is a "concept seeker and "object maker" this can be seen through her like Smog Collectors.

Kim Victoria Abeles received her BFA in painting from Ohio University and earned a MFA in studio art from the University of California, Irvine in 1980. In connection with her thesis, about Shingon Buddhism, she created constructions incorporating kimono.

Critics connect Abeles' early works to those of Edward Kienholz and Wallace Berman, founders of the California assemblage tradition. Kienholz's The State Hospital was an early inspiration to Abeles.

== Work ==
Abeles has worked in a variety of different mediums including repurposed materials, drawing, multimedia, sculpture and installations. She often experiments with materials. Intensive research, in which she immerses herself in her subject, is a significant part of her working process. Kim Abeles commented on her art as, "results from the urban experience, chronicling historical and contemporary issues housed in sculpture and installation." Her work begins with a singular person or idea and through her own independent research and exploration will delve into her chosen topic until she feels comfortable beginning her artwork. She describes her artwork as the poetic spirit in a visual language.

Many of her projects address contemporary social and environmental issues. She has explored topics including HIV/AIDS, pollution, gender roles, domestic violence, feminism, civil rights, and labor. Kim Abeles explores such topical issues through humor and metaphors. Most of her work has revolved around three central themes: civil rights, feminism, and the environment. With her range of media and distinctive styles, Kim Abeles seamlessly unites her call for activism with her work aesthetics through new innovative techniques.

=== Collaborative work ===
Abeles has worked with several educational organizations and schools to collaborate on installations and exhibitions. She has worked with the multiple art centers like: The Contemporary Art Center in Cincinnati, Community Arts Resource in Santa Monica, Orange Country Museum of Art Teen Council, the California Science Center, and the CU Museum of Natural History in Boulder. Her more defining collaborators include the Bureau of Automotive Repair, the Santa Monica Bay Restoration Project, and the Lakota Indians of South Dakota.

=== The Smog Collector ===
In 1987, her work Smog Collector caught national and international attention, mentioned in Newsweek, National Public Radio, CBS Evening News, and The Wall Street Journal. Abeles accreits this piece as a tribute to what she first noticed upon moving into her new art studio in the city of Los Angeles- the smog. Abeles created an innovative technique, using stencils and adhesives to collect smog particulate and produce symbols and images. Abeles was motivated to create the project through her own curiosity and the effects of a year-long protest against a factory near her home that she said was "spewing formaldehyde". She considers the work an ongoing series to which she is currently contributing. Her work was memorialized in the book, Kim Abeles: Smog Collectors, 1987-2020.

"The Smog Collectors materialize the reality of the air we breathe. I place cut, stenciled images on transparent or opaque plates or fabric, then leave these on the roof of my studio and let the particulate matter in the heavy air fall upon them. After a period of time, from four days to a month, the stencil is removed and the image is revealed in smog."

=== To Sit As Ladder (In Honor of Rosa Parks) ===
In some of her works pertaining to human rights, Abeles has taken a subjective approach that includes a presentation of individuals' portraits through text, maps, drawings, and objects. An example is her 1991 sculpture To Sit As Ladder (In Honor of Rosa Parks) which displayed a chair with text to represent the life of Rosa Parks.

=== HIV/AIDS Tarot ===
Abeles' HIV/AIDS Tarot cards incorporate both image and text and discuss issues pertaining to the socioeconomic and medical aspects of AIDS. Only seven cards were issued, not a complete Tarot deck. They were printed in both English and Spanish and used as part of a public health information program in Los Angeles in 1992.

=== The Golden Mile ===
The Golden Mile is a 120 foot long photographic visual art piece located in the UK. The piece consists of photographs capturing both the East and West (stretching from the years 2003 - 2006) laid out and displayed at opposing ends. This installation was funded by Arts Council England, West Midlands, and The Public.

=== Walk a Mile in My Shoes ===
The initial inspiration for Walk a Mile in My Shoes was the political work of Martin Luther King Jr. and the civil rights movement. Searching for images of King's actual shoes, Abeles was deeply affected when she viewed civil rights activist Xernona Clayton's "profound collection of shoes belonging to members of the peace marches." The installations she created at the intersections of Jefferson Blvd. and Rodeo Rd. and Martin Luther King Jr. Blvd. included bronze casts of King's work boots as well as photographs of national and local activists' shoes.

=== Pearls of Wisdom: End the Violence ===
Created for a nonprofit organization, A Window Between Worlds (AWBW), Kim Abeles gathered 800 participants who are domestic violence victims to share their stories and design a pearl. The pearl-making process requires mylar paper, yarn, bandage, fiber cable, paint, and an "Irritant"; any object can be an irritant depending on the maker that denotes their experience. Abeles encapsulates a powerful message through her work:

"These women are not survivors, but rather, they are champions in the athletic and spiritual sense."

=== Citizen Seeds ===
Citizen Seeds is a public, permanent art installation created in 2020 that follows along the Playa to Park trail, funded by the Los Angeles County Arts & Culture. This piece features different sculptures of seeds created through mixed media in which the community, environments, and local journeys are illustrated and represented.

== Exhibitions ==
Abeles has exhibited her work in twenty-two countries, including Vietnam, Thailand, the Czech Republic, England, China, and South Korea. Abeles' work has been shown at National Center for Atmospheric Research; Museum of Arts and Design in New York; National Museum of Fine Arts in Santiago; Museum of Contemporary Art in Los Angeles; Museum of Modern Art in Rio de Janeiro; and, Intersection for the Arts in San Francisco. She has also been a United States representative in Antwerp for Fotografie Biennale Rotterdam and Cultural Centre of Berchem.

Kim Abeles took her art to the road in 1993 with the release of Kim Abeles: Encyclopedia Persona A-Z. The collection, curated by Karen Moss of the Santa Monica Museum, was sponsored by The Fellows of Contemporary Art in North America and United States Information Agency in South America.

Her art show Encyclopedia Persona, at the Santa Monica Museum of Art, featured a 15-year survey of her work; including 80 of her sculptures, installations and artist's books.

== List of solo exhibitions ==
Abeles's work comes a long way, but listed here are the recent exhibitions within the last 5 years:

- Nicholas and Lee Begovich Gallery , California State University Fullerton (2021)
- Community Room, Armory Center for the Arts, Pasadena, CA (2018)
- Frank M. Doyle Arts Pavilion, Orange Coast College, Costa Mesa, CA (2017)
- LA Art Show, Downtown Los Angeles Art Walk at the Convention Center, Los Angeles, CA (2017)
- Marlborough School, Los Angeles PØST, Los Angeles, CA (2016)

== Awards ==
Abeles is the recipient of a number of awards from the Guggenheim Fellowship, the J. Paul Getty Trust Fund for the Visual Arts, the Andy Warhol Foundation, the California Community Foundation, and the California Arts Council.
