= Avel =

Russian masculine given name

Avel is a masculine first name. In the Russian language, "А́вель" (Avel) is a form of the first name Abel used in biblical contexts. It is also an old and uncommon male first name, derived from the Biblical Hebrew word hebel, meaning a gentle breathe. This is most commonly pronounced “Aye-Vuhl”, though some pronounce it as “Eye-Vehl”.

The diminutives of "Avel" are Avelya (Аве́ля), Velya (Ве́ля), Avilya (Ави́ля), Vilya (Ви́ля), and Ava (А́ва). The patronymics derived from "Avel" are "А́велевич" (Avelevich; masculine) and "А́велевна" (Avelevna; feminine).

Other definition of Avel is HİLAL.

== People ==
- Avel Gordly (b. 1947), US politician and activist
- Avel de Knight (1923–1995), American artist
- Avel Makayev (1860–1920), also known as Abel Makashvili, Georgian prince
- Avel Yenukidze (1877–1937), Georgian Soviet Bolshevik
