= Abell =

Abell may refer to:

== People ==
- Abell (surname)
- George O. Abell, of the astronomical catalogues fame

== Places ==
- Abell, Maryland, a location in St. Mary's County, Maryland
- Abell, a neighborhood in Baltimore, Maryland
- Abells Corners, Wisconsin, an unincorporated community

== Astronomy ==
- Abell catalogue of rich clusters of galaxies (ACO)
- Abell Catalog of Planetary Nebulae (A)

== Bibliographical database ==
- ABELL, the Annual Bibliography of English Language and Literature

== See also ==
- Abel (disambiguation)
