= Cains & Abels =

American musical group

- Origin: Grand Rapids, Michigan, U.S.
- Genres: Rock
- Years active: 2003–present
- Label: States Rights Records
- Members: David Sampson (vocals, bass); Joshua Ippel (guitar); Jamie McGaw (drums)
- Past members: Jonathan Dawe (drums, vocals; Michelle Vondiziano (keyboards, vocals)
- Website: Cains & Abels

Cains & Abels is an American musical group originally from Grand Rapids, Michigan, and currently based in Chicago, Illinois. The band consists of David Sampson (vocals, bass guitar), Joshua Ippel (guitar), Jonathan Dawe (drums, vocals) and Michelle Vondiziano (keyboards, vocals). The band members met in 2003 while attending Calvin College.

In May 2009, Cains & Abels released Call Me Up on States Rights Records. In a Pitchfork Media list, the post-Afrobeat dance explosion band NOMO named it one of the best albums of 2008, though the album did not officially come out until 2009.

The MP3 blog Said the Gramophone listed Cains & Abels' 2009 single "My Life is Easy" in its Best Songs of 2009.

== Discography ==
=== Studio albums ===
- Call Me Up (May 2009) - States Rights Records
- My Life is Easy (March 2012) - Whistler Records

=== EPs ===
- Clean Air, Cloud Science (2005) - New Blood
- The Price Is Right (2011) - Positive Beat Recordings

=== Compilations ===
- Grown Zone/Groan Zone (2007) - States Rights Records
- Bro Zone (2005) - States Rights RecordsGrown Zone/Groan Zone
