= Johann Martin Abele =

German publisher (1753–1805)

Johann Martin Abele (31 March 1753 – 3 September 1805) was a German publisher.

Abele was born in Darmstadt. He acquired his doctorate in law from the University of Göttingen and began to hold lectures there. In 1779 he was offered the position of town syndic in Kempten. He held different positions in civil service until the incorporation of the town to Bavarian Palatinate in 1802. In 1791, he was awarded nobility by the Emperor and in 1798 he became Council of the Court in Öttingen-Wallerstein.

Abele owned a printing office and bookshop in Kempten and published various releases both from others and himself, as well as a journal Neueste Weltbegebenheiten, von einem Weltbürger (Worlds newest events, from a cosmopolitan).

In 1802, Abele entered the service of the new government and died at Ulm as section director of the Country Directorate and the first secular councillor of the Consistorium.

== Publications ==
- Neueste Weltbegebenheiten, von einem Weltbürger, journal
- Historisch-statistisches Magazin, vornehmlich von Oberdeutschland, 2 booklets, 1785, 1786
- Sammlung der merkwürdigsten Staatsschriften über Ländertausch und Fürstenverein, 2 booklets, 1785, 1786
- Guillaume Thomas François Raynal: Geschichte der Besitzungen und Handlungen der Europäer in beiden Indien, 11 volumes, 1784–1788, partially by Abele
- William Robertson: Geschichte der Regierung Kaiser Karl V., 3 volumes, reprint of the translation by Mittelstedt, 1778–79
- Vom Verhältnis der Magistrate und der Bürgerschaft in den Reichsstädten, 1780
- Versuch über das teutsche Staatsrecht während eines Zwischenreichs, 1792
