= Abel of Tacla Haimonot =

Saint
- Venerated in: Coptic Orthodox Church
- Feast: July 13

Abel of Tacla Haimonot was a monk at the monastery of Tacla Haimonot. He is considered a saint of the Coptic Orthodox Church, and has a feast day of July 13.
