= Əvilə =

- Municipality
- Location within Azerbaijan
- Coordinates: 38°49′08″N 48°23′59″E
- Country: Azerbaijan
- Rayon: Lerik

Population
  - Total: 593
- Time zone: UTC+4 (AZT)
  - Summer (DST): UTC+5 (AZT)

Əvilə (also, Avelya and Avilya) is a village and municipality in the Lerik Rayon of Azerbaijan. It has a population of 593.
