= Abell (surname) =

Abell is an English surname, from the given name Abel. Notable people with the surname include:

- Abraham Abell (1789–1851), Irish antiquarian
- Anthony Abell (1906–1994), British colonial official, Governor of Sarawak
- Adam Abell (c.1480–c.1540), Scottish friar
- Alexander G. Abell (1818–1890), American diplomat and writer
- Alistair Abell, Canadian voice actor
- Arunah Shepherdson Abell (1806–1888), American newspaper publisher
- Ben Abell (1932–2019), American meteorologist
- Bud Abell (born 1940), American football player
- Chris Abell (1957–2020), British biological chemist
- David Abell (disambiguation), several people
- Derek F. Abell (born 1938), American businessman and educator
- Earl Abell (1892–1956), American football player
- Ferdinand Abell (died 1928), American businessman
- George Abell (disambiguation), several people
- Irvin Abell (1876–1949), American surgeon
- Joey Abell (born 1981), American boxer
- John Abell (1653–c.1724), Scottish musician and composer
- John Abell (cricketer) (1931–2004), English cricketer
- Kjeld Abell (1901–1961), Danish dramatist
- Louis Abell (1884–1962), American Olympic rower
- Myron Abell (1864-1940), American politician
- Peter Abell (born 1939), British social scientist
- Richard Abell (c.1688–after 1744), British politician
- Roy Abell (1931–2020), English cricketer and artist
- Sam Abell (born 1945), American photographer
- Stig Abell (born 1980), British journalist
- Thomas Abel (martyr) (or Abell) (c.1497–1540), English priest and martyr
- Timothy Abell (1930–2009), English cricketer
- Tom Abell (born 1994), English cricketer
- Walter Abell (1897–1956), American art teacher and theoretician
- William Abell, (c.1584–c.1655) English vintner
- Westcott Stile Abell, (1877–1961), British naval architect

== See also ==
- Abel (surname)
