= Anthony Abell =

British colonial administrator (1906–1994)

Dato Laila Utama Sir Anthony Abell KCMG DK
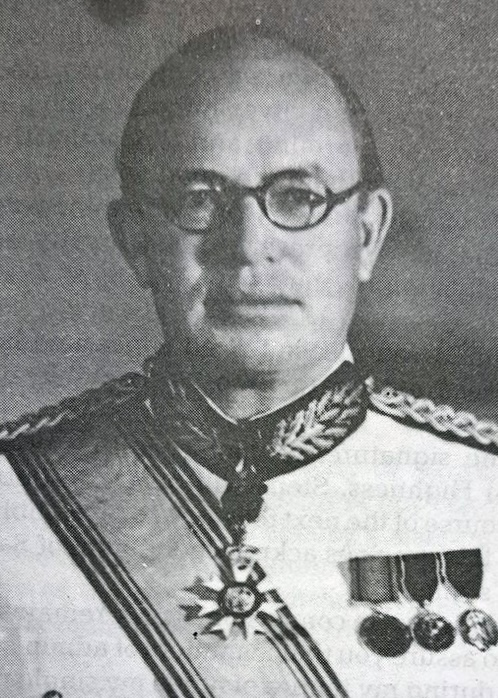
- Abell, c. 1954

3rd Governor of Sarawak
- In office 4 April 1950 – 14 November 1959
- Monarchs: George VI; Elizabeth II
- Preceded by: Duncan Stewart
- Succeeded by: Alexander Waddell

Gentleman Usher of the Blue Rod
- In office 1972–1979
- Monarch: Elizabeth II
- Preceded by: Sir George Beresford-Stooke
- Succeeded by: Sir John Moreton

Personal details
- Born: Anthony Foster Abell; 11 December 1906 Bridgnorth, Shropshire
- Died: 8 October 1994 (aged 87) Winchester, Hampshire
- Relations: George Abell (brother); John Abell (nephew); Timothy Abell (nephew); Ted Sale (uncle)
- Education: Repton School; Magdalen College, Oxford
- Occupation: Colonial administrator

Anthony Foster Abell (11 December 1906 – 8 October 1994) was a British colonial administrator who served as the governor of Sarawak and concurrently as high commissioner to Brunei from 1950 to 1959. With nine years in office, he held the record for the longest tenure.

During his time in Brunei, Abell faced significant challenges in managing the territory's evolving administration while navigating the complex political dynamics of British interests. Appointed to oversee political reforms in Brunei in the same year that Sultan Omar Ali Saifuddien III ascended to the throne, Abell's role was pivotal. However, despite his considerable skill and moral integrity, he struggled to align with Brunei's aspirations and was often outmanoeuvred by Omar Ali Saifuddien. His tenure ended shortly after the sultan succeeded in securing Brunei's first written constitution in 1959, which granted Brunei's greater executive authority. Though Abell was unable to implement his intended reforms, he left Brunei disillusioned but continued to play a significant role in Brunei–United Kingdom relations during this critical period.

== Early life and education ==
Anthony Foster Abell was born in Bridgnorth, England, on 11 December 1906, the second son of George Foster Abell of Foxcote Manor, Andoversford, and Jessie Elizabeth Brackenbury. He had an older brother, George Abell, who was a cricketer and civil servant. Abell was educated at Repton School and Magdalen College, Oxford.

== Career ==
=== Early career ===
Abell began his colonial service in 1929 and served in the Oyo province of Colonial Nigeria until 1949. He then appointed governor and commander-in-chief of Sarawak on 19 January 1950, succeeding Duncan George Stewart, who had been assassinated in December 1949. He was appointed as the third governor of Sarawak by King George VI on 22 February 1950. Later that year, on 4 April, Abell officially assumed office, with the oath-taking ceremony held in Singapore on 5 April.

=== High Commissioner of Brunei ===
Later in 1950, he was appointed high commissioner to Brunei, where he was tasked with establishing a written constitution for the state as part of the Colonial Office's broader efforts to improve governance and legal clarity. After receiving a comprehensive briefing, Abell embarked on the sensitive task of presenting the idea to the sultan, while Sarawakian legal officers, under the direction of the Colonial Office, drafted the necessary laws to be presented to the State Council.

Unlike his predecessor, Abell took a more active role in Brunei's administration, which coincided with the ascension of Omar Ali Saifuddien and required a renegotiation of their political relationship. The dynamics between the sultan, British Resident Eric Ernest Falk Pretty, and the high commissioner shifted significantly with Abell's appointment in 1950. Unlike his predecessors, who were based in Singapore, Abell was stationed in close proximity to Brunei, with his headquarters in Sarawak, allowing him to become more directly involved in the administration. This change was further reinforced by a personnel agreement between Brunei and Sarawak, which saw many officers seconded from Sarawak, thereby granting Abell greater authority over their responsibilities.

In order to obtain political and financial concessions from Omar Ali Saifuddien, British authorities purposefully encouraged Abell to establish a close personal relationship with him. As a result, Abell increasingly took on the British Resident's customary advisory role, unintentionally undermining the position's authority by speaking directly with Omar Ali Saifuddien and his advisors. While Abell recognised the sultan's growing political autonomy, he found it challenging to reverse this shift, understanding that Brunei's power structure had been altered by the sultan increasing independence and political maturity. Abell was also present at the Omar Ali Saifuddien's coronation in 1951, a significant event that highlighted the new sultan's qualities. Abell played a crucial role in supporting the sultan's rise, with other officials, like Malcolm MacDonald, expressing their strong belief in the sultan's leadership abilities during the ceremony.

Abell believed that the Brunei Police Force's lower-level officers were untrustworthy and susceptible to A. M. Azahari's influence. In the lead-up to the BRUFICO Affair, rumours of disturbances, including police desertions and the potential for rebellion, spread before an appeal hearing in March 1953. Abell raised concerns about police loyalty, particularly after six Seria constables joined the rebel forces. He credited reinforcements from Sarawak and North Borneo for maintaining Brunei's stability during the disturbances. The increased police presence helped prevent major conflicts, and by 12 March, as tensions eased, the Sarawak detachment remained in Seria while the North Borneo forces returned home. In British circles, there were unfounded rumours suggesting that Indonesia was involved in the BRUFICO Affair. Although intelligence reports in March 1953 indicated that Indonesia might have influenced the Bruneian police, British officials, including Abell and Hector Hales of the British Malayan Petroleum Company, believed that Indonesia's role was indirect and that Bruneians were largely responsible for the movement. Azahari's actions were seen as a local phenomenon, influenced by Indonesian practices, but Abell would have informed the Colonial Office had there been concrete evidence of Indonesian involvement.

Because of the shifting political climate, Abell was in favor of revising Britain's ties with Brunei. He and other British officials felt that the advise section needed to be made clearer in order to define the administration's responsibilities. This prompted the idea of drafting a constitution outlining the British Resident's authority, which was perceived as a means of bolstering British authority in the face of regional instability and Azahari's demands for democratic reform. Negotiating the constitutional amendments with Omar Ali Saifuddien and his advisors proved a drawn-out process, nevertheless, because Brunei was not a colony.

=== Sarawak-North Borneo-Brunei Conference ===
The first Sarawak-North Borneo-Brunei Conference took place in Kuching on 21 April 1953, with Brunei represented by Omar Ali Saifuddien, British Resident John Coleraine Hanbury Barcroft, and Ibrahim Mohammad Jahfar. Abell and MacDonald encouraged the sultan to attend to ensure the conference's success and legitimacy. Later, on 13 May, Abell initially focused on political solutions for Brunei, such as revising the treaty and drafting a written constitution, without mentioning a significant $100 million development plan. However, by June, he acknowledged the plan, which was awaiting Omar Ali Saifuddien's approval. It appeared that the sultan took advantage of the situation, viewing the development fund as a way to address the growing political demands and the aspirations of his subjects, who were aware of Brunei's increasing wealth. Abell's concerns shifted as he navigated this complex balance between political reform and the sultan's control over Brunei's resources.

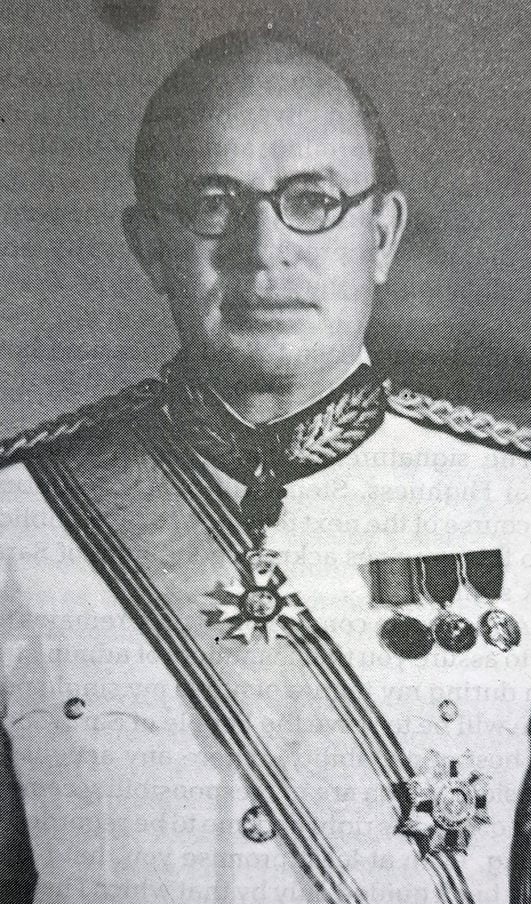
Abell wearing the sash of the Order of Brunei

In 1954, Abell received permission from Elizabeth II to wear the Most Esteemed Family Order of Brunei, First Class, awarded by Omar Ali Saifuddien for his valuable services. That same year, the first step in Brunei's constitution-making process was taken with the creation of District Advisory Councils in September. These councils, designed to support the administration and offer a platform for resolving public complaints, were made up of both elected and appointed members. However, they soon became forums for nationalist debates, often touching on matters belonging to the State Council. Abell voiced concerns about the councils' tendency to overreach and impede decision-making, as well as the mounting pressure on the British government due to Malay members using the State Council to criticise British policies as the councils gained power. In October, during a conference of British governors in Kuching, Abell strongly opposed the proposal to merge Brunei with its neighbouring territories of North Borneo and Singapore. He argued that Brunei would view such a move as an attempt to seize its wealth, warning that it would require troops to erase the geographical boundaries and could push Brunei into aligning with another power. Abell's stance highlighted his concerns over Brunei's autonomy and the risks of forcing closer political association.

In November 1954, Hugh Hickling was asked to visit Brunei to study the country's constitutional procedures and assist in drafting a new one. His report, completed in January 1955, had a significant influence on British thinking, particularly in persuading officials like Abell—and the Colonial Office through him—of Brunei's special relationship with Britain. The report reinforced the idea that the Brunei government had direct authority over certain domestic issues in Brunei, strengthening Abell's argument for a neo-colonial constitutional system. On 23 March 1955, Abell delivered two separate dispatches to the Colonial Office. Dispatch No. 47, which contained confidential annexes not shared with Omar Ali Saifuddien, and Dispatch No. 46, which included reports and annexes that were shared with him, allowed Abell to voice his concerns about the State Council's obstructive actions. In this second dispatch, he recommended changes to the government's decision-making procedures and highlighted a lack of transparency, which validated some of the Sultan's concerns regarding British objectives. In his efforts to consolidate British control, Abell removed Brunei's two senior wazirs from political authority, replacing them with a ceremonial Privy Council, aiming to limit their influence. He also suggested granting the British veto power in the new constitution, keeping the high commissioner and resident in place indefinitely, and implementing a Nationality Enactment to grant British-protected citizens, mostly Chinese, the right to vote—though he decided not to inform Omar Ali Saifuddien of this plan.

The Omar Ali Saifuddien's trust in Abell was severely undermined when his covert schemes were uncovered, damaging their relationship significantly. Although Abell had hoped to convince the sultan to approve the new constitution, immediate difficulties arose. The British misinterpreted Bruneian national sentiment by attempting to incorporate Brunei into a British-Borneo bloc and relying too heavily on Sarawak's constitutional model. This led to increasing suspicion and resentment among Bruneians, particularly nationalists like vernacular teachers, who pushed for genuine self-rule through British-led constitutional reforms. Abell remained determined to stay in Brunei as both resident and high commissioner. His vision was for the resident to perform executive functions similar to a colonial secretary, while the high commissioner would provide general direction akin to a colonial governor. Rather than being involved in day-to-day administration, Abell argued that Brunei's growing development needs required an experienced British advisor, who would have the time to "educate" and "persuade" Omar Ali Saifuddien and senior officials. To be more effective, he suggested that the high commissioner should live in Brunei. Earlier, in 1948, Abell had proposed severing Brunei's administrative ties with Sarawak to strengthen Brunei's connections with other British colonies in Borneo.

The process was restarted after Abell discovered in May 1955 that Omar Ali Saifuddien had rejected the proposed constitutional revisions. Omar Ali Saifuddien was reassured when Abell pledged to restrict the high commissioner's and resident's authority to crucial domains like security and finance in order to reduce conflicts. But Abell also had to give up to the sultan's insistence that the state religious adviser and the two wazirs be represented on all important councils, which undermined the British goal of reorganising the Brunei government.

=== Rise of the Parti Rakyat Brunei ===
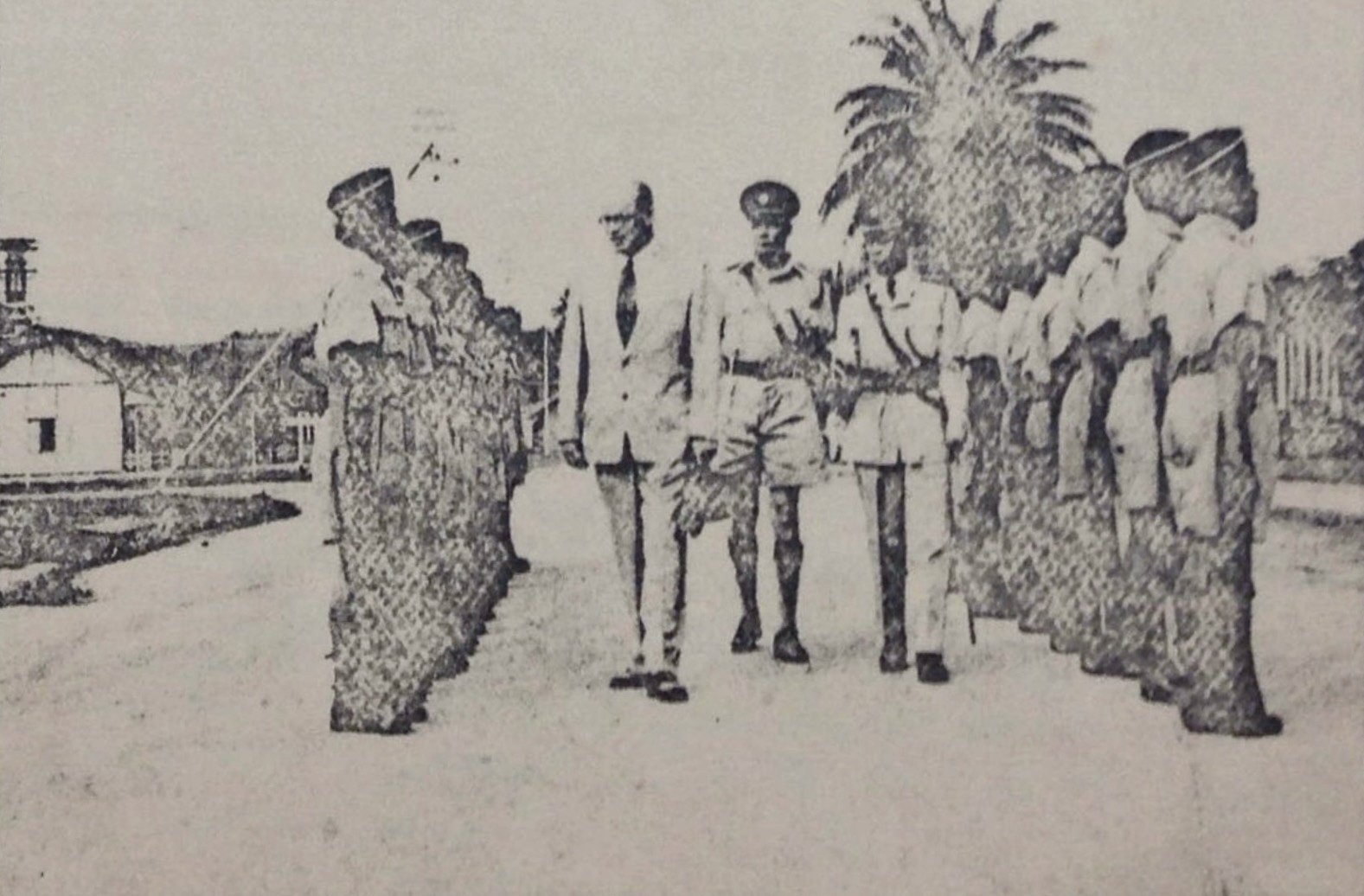
From left to right: Abell, Allen Neil Outram, and Pengiran Jaya, inspecting the honour guard in 1956

By early 1957, the Parti Rakyat Brunei (PRB) claimed to have 16,000 members, making up around 75% of Brunei's adult male population. While the accuracy of this statistic was uncertain, the PRB's influence was clear. In February, Abell noted that the party had "now assumed the proportion of a national movement." The PRB's first annual conference in March saw around 500 delegates, some of whom traveled from distant places like Sibuti and Sipitang. Although leaders from Singapore and Malaya were invited, they were not allowed to enter Brunei. The congress aimed to formalise the party's policies and elect the Executive Council. Meanwhile, as Resident John Orman Gilbert's relationship with Omar Ali Saifuddien worsened, Abell found himself in a difficult position. The rift began in June 1957, when Gilbert welcomed Walter Raeburn, an action the sultan viewed as disrespectful. Omar Ali Saifuddien also criticised Gilbert's management of Brunei's oil interests, especially as the PRB's influence grew, accusing him of sympathising with Azahari, which further contributed to the PRB's popularity.

Abell's defence of Gilbert only worsened his relationship with Omar Ali Saifuddien, especially as the sultan grew frustrated with Gilbert's involvement in constitutional talks. Their personal tensions peaked in early 1957, during Ramadan, and by August, Abell acknowledged that they had fallen behind the sultan. This prompted him to take a more assertive stance, though he questioned whether the constitution should be based on a figure he saw as unstable, and he doubted the Colonial Office's approach to appeasing him. Abell's efforts to reform Brunei's political structure became increasingly futile due to opposition from the Bruneian elite and his frustration with what he saw as ignorance and bigotry impeding progress. Unable to reconcile his imperialist beliefs with Brunei's push for a chief minister, Abell reluctantly backed away from direct conflict. Meanwhile, Omar Ali Saifuddien was determined to secure a constitution that favoured Brunei's interests over Britain's, confident that he would prevail in upcoming talks. Abell attended the opening ceremony of Brunei Airport on 8 May 1957, alongside Omar Ali Saifuddien and other officials.

Omar Ali Saifuddien and a disinterested Colonial Office opposed Abell's attempt to directly influence the sultan. By the end of 1958, he recognised his defeat, acknowledging that his involvement in the State Council deliberations had made him a principal enemy. He recommended that the State Council begin constitutional talks directly with the British government, a proposal accepted by the sultan's advisors, who agreed to send a delegation to London. This unilateral action infuriated the Colonial Office, as Abell had not consulted them beforehand. They chastised him for distancing himself from future discussions, believing this would complicate matters further. Despite this, Abell continued to work with Brunei's constitutional advisors to resolve disputes before the London meeting, aiming to maintain essential British authority. He put forward a "package" plan, which included Brunei's separation from the Sarawak government, a proposal that had sparked controversy between him, Omar Ali Saifuddien, and the Colonial Office. In an attempt to ease tensions, Abell worked with Panglima Bukit Gantang, the newly appointed Malay constitutional adviser, to address contentious issues before the Brunei delegation's departure for the London Conference. Nevertheless, Abell remained focused on ensuring British control to uphold treaty obligations. The Colonial Office opposed the separation and preferred that Brunei first establish its constitution before considering such changes.

Abell acknowledged that the idea of self-government in Brunei might be compromised if the British continued to hold key public sector positions. In response to Gracie's 1958 report on public service issues, he admitted that the London Agreement had intended for Her Majesty's Colonial Office Service personnel to occupy these positions unless equally competent candidates were available. Despite Omar Ali Saifuddien's displeasure at having to accept candidates solely nominated by the British government, Abell maintained that the high commissioner required "tried and trusted" personnel to ensure effective administration, reflecting a reluctance to relinquish British authority over these appointments. Meanwhile, the idea of a closer alliance between Brunei, Sarawak, and North Borneo gained traction in 1955, as fears grew of being overshadowed by Malaya following its approach to independence. In 1958, the governors of Sarawak and North Borneo, alongside Abell and Roland Turnbull, introduced the notion of a tighter connection, aiming to spark public debate despite their ambiguous and hesitant statements. This marked a critical turning point in the region's political discourse. That same year, Abell recognised the completion of the Omar Ali Saifuddien Mosque as a significant achievement for Omar Ali Saifuddien, calling it a "triumph." While the event gave the sultan considerable political leverage, Abell expressed concerns about the enthusiastic crowd, fearing the sultan might be harmed by the overwhelming attention. Despite the celebratory atmosphere, Abell noted that the British government remained concerned that the people's religious fervour would not compensate for the political changes Omar Ali Saifuddien had promised, with the mosque's opening distracting from constitutional matters for much of the latter part of the year.

=== Declining British control ===
In 1958, Abell recommended the transfer of Gilbert to improve relations with Omar Ali Saifuddien, acknowledging Gilbert's diligent efforts but recognising that both the sultan and the State Council had grown increasingly hostile towards him. Despite his patience and firmness in pushing through reforms, Gilbert became ineffective as the Sultan began ignoring even good advice, prompting the need for a leadership change. Abell, discouraged by the sultan's constitutional modifications and his attempts to undermine British authority, struggled to understand why Bruneians supported both Omar Ali Saifuddien and nationalist goals. Concerned about the sultan's direct communication with the Secretary of State and its potential to paralyze the government, Abell advocated for maintaining significant British influence, particularly in the oil sector. However, the Colonial Office advised Abell to adopt a more balanced approach. On 17 December 1958, Abell flew to Brunei to officiate the opening of Anthony Abell College in Seria, returning to Kuching the next day.

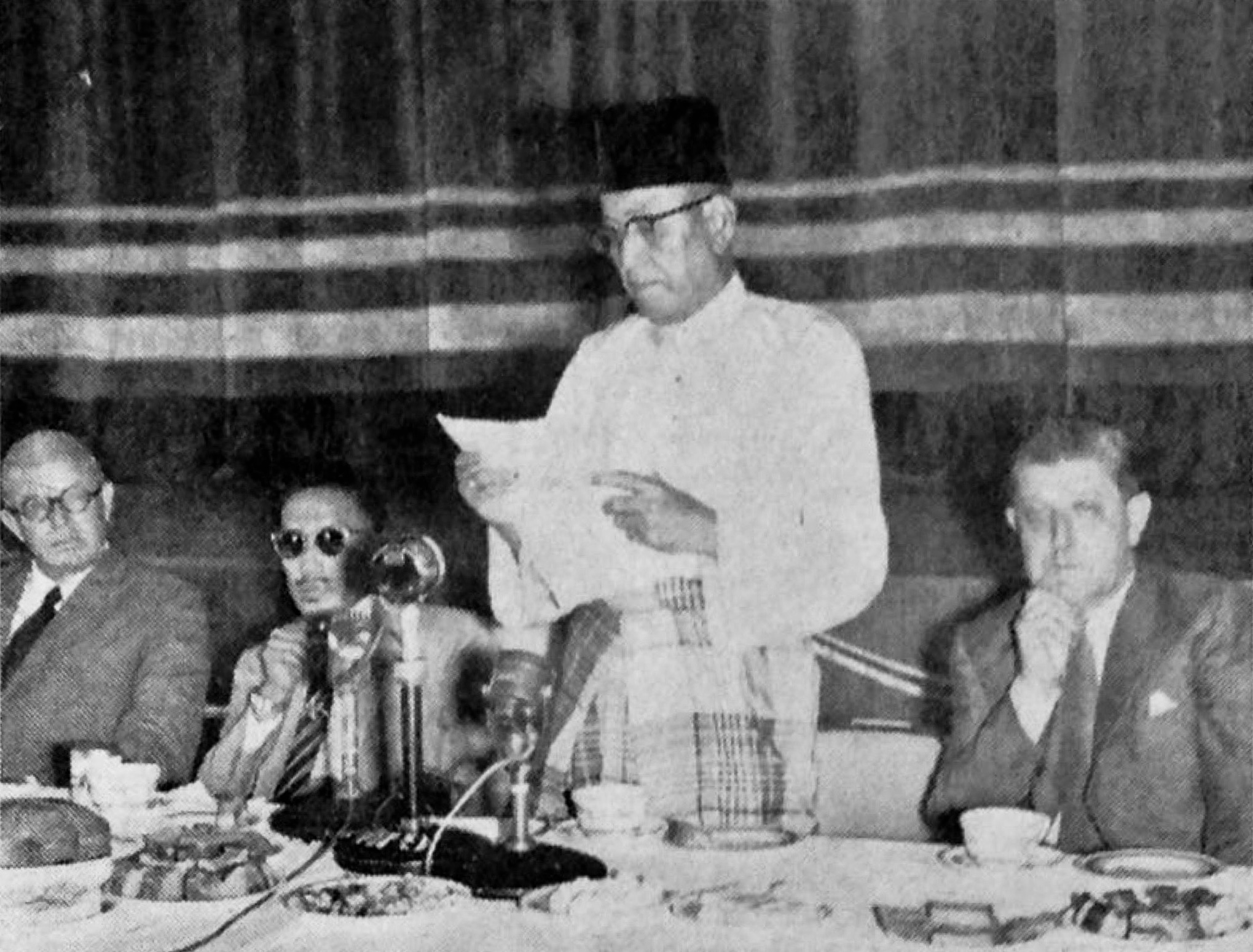
From left to right: Abell, Omar Ali Saifuddien, Yusof Husain and White at the Civic Centre in 1959

In 1959, Omar Ali Saifuddien's decision to hire Malayan officers for Brunei's administrative roles alarmed Abell, especially following the sultan's visits to the Federation and reciprocal visits from Malay dignitaries. While Abell attempted to preserve British influence by keeping Sarawak officers in key positions, British authorities were concerned this would diminish their control over Brunei's new government. Despite growing Malayan influence, Abell remained determined to protect British interests amid strong local opposition. However, despite his efforts in shaping the Brunei constitution, Abell was absent from its signing on 29 September 1959, feeling betrayed by the Colonial Office, which did not support his principles. In the end, the sultan's stubbornness prevailed, and he triumphed in his constitutional battle with Abell.

Abell insisted on maintaining sweeping British control over Brunei's police force and security matters, believing the British should hold full authority. However, Dennis White, the Resident, warned that this approach could lead Brunei to reject British control over internal security. As the signing of the constitution approached, Abell requested a delay to attend a farewell party in Kuching, but his request was denied. By the time of the ceremony, Abell had become disillusioned with Brunei, and the Colonial Office recognised that his presence would not be welcomed by Omar Ali Saifuddien. Consequently, Robert Scott represented the British government, while Abell was relegated to signing a separate agreement, marking the end of his involvement with Brunei's constitutional development. Abell retired on 14 November 1959 after a memorable farewell ceremony, concluding his three terms in office.

== Later life and death ==
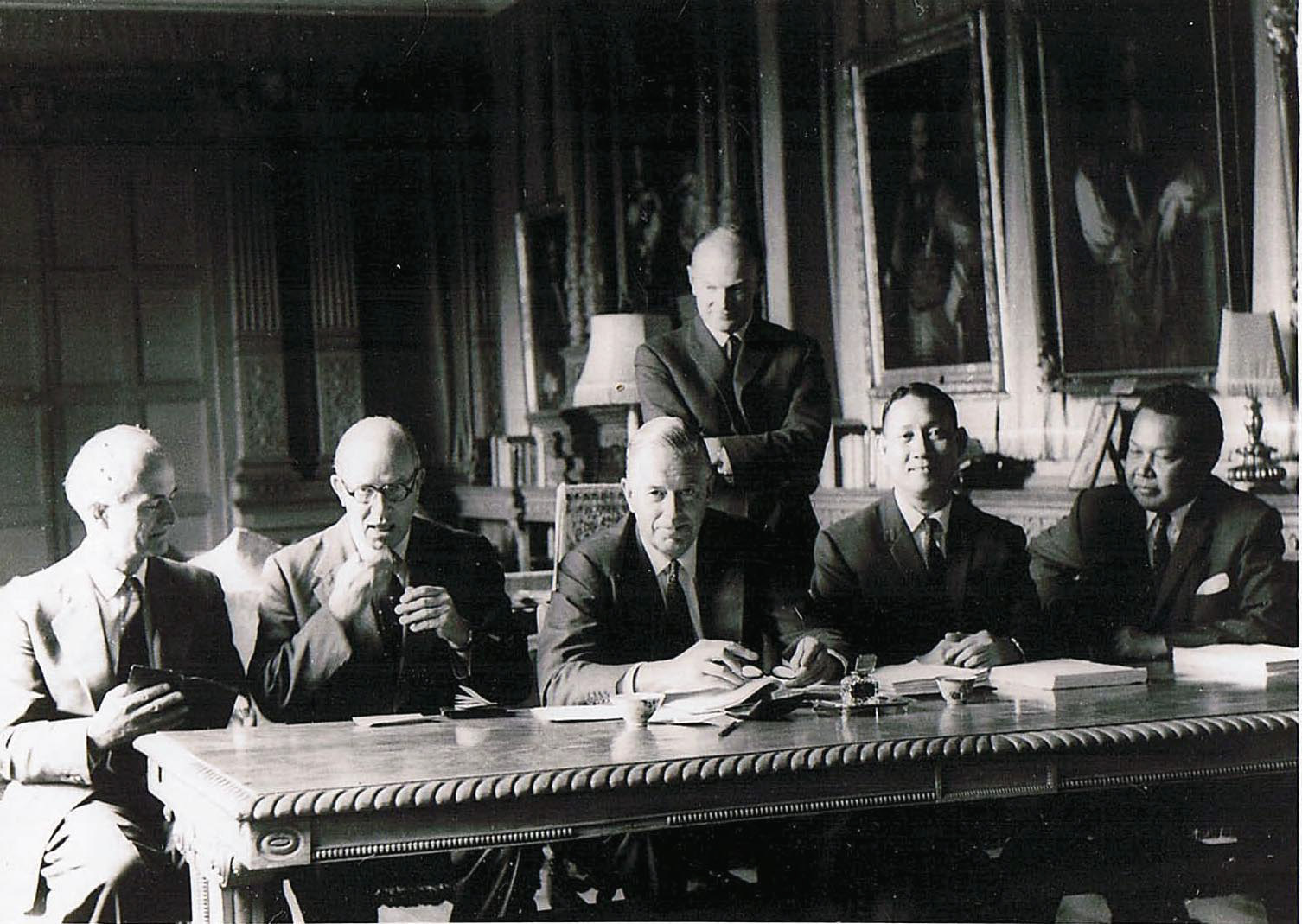
Abell (Standing) at the signing of the Cobbold Report in 1962

Due to disputes between the British and Malayan administrations regarding its leadership, the Cobbold Commission, tasked with gathering public opinions in Sarawak and North Borneo about joining Malaysia, took time to form. Once established, the commission, presided over by Cameron Cobbold, toured the two colonies from February to April 1962, meeting with various organisations and individuals. During their visit to Brunei, they also met with Omar Ali Saifuddien and his ministers. After several weeks of work in England, the commission presented its findings in June 1962. Although Abell and David Watherston, along with other members, contributed their own recommendations, they ultimately reached a consensus on the broad level of support for Malaysia.

Abell served as Gentleman Usher of the Blue Rod from 1972 to 1979 and died on 8 October 1994 in the Winchester district of Hampshire, aged 87.

== Personal life ==
Abell was unmarried.

== Honours ==
Anthony Abell College is a secondary school located in Seria, in the Belait District, is named in his honour. In addition, Abell has received several national and international honours:

National

- Knight Commander of the Order of St Michael and St George (KCMG; 1952) -- Sir
- Companion of the Order of St Michael and St George (CMG; 1950)
- Queen Elizabeth II Coronation Medal (2 June 1953)
- Defence Medal

Foreign

- Brunei:
  - Family Order of Laila Utama (DK; 1954) – Dato Laila Utama

Government offices
Preceded by Duncan Stewart	Governor of Sarawak; 1949–1959	Succeeded by Sir Alexander Waddell
Diplomatic posts
Preceded by Duncan Stewart	High Commissioner to Brunei; 1950–1958	Succeeded by Sir Dennis White
Court offices
Preceded by Sir George Beresford-Stooke	Gentleman Usher of the Blue Rod; 1972–1979	Succeeded by Sir John Moreton
