= James Weatherall =

Royal Navy officer (1936-2018)

Vice-Admiral Sir James Weatherall KCVO KBE
- Born: James Lamb Weatherall; 29 February 1936
- Died: 18 March 2018 (aged 82)
- Military career
- Allegiance: United Kingdom
- Branch: Royal Navy
- Service years: 1954–1991
- Rank: Vice-Admiral
- Commands: HMS Andromeda; HMS Ark Royal
- Conflicts: Falklands War
- Awards: Knight Commander of the Royal Victorian Order; Knight Commander of the Order of the British Empire

Sir James Lamb Weatherall KCVO KBE (28 February 1936 – 18 March 2018) was a senior Royal Navy officer who served as Deputy Supreme Allied Commander Atlantic from 1989 to 1991 and then as Her Majesty's Marshal of the Diplomatic Corps from 1992 to 2001.

== Naval career ==
Educated at Gordonstoun School and the Royal Naval College, Dartmouth, Weatherall joined the Royal Navy in 1954. He was given command of the frigate HMS Andromeda in 1982, serving with her in the Falklands War, and took command of the aircraft carrier HMS Ark Royal in 1985. He joined the staff of the Supreme Allied Commander Europe in 1987 and then became Deputy Supreme Allied Commander Atlantic in 1989 before retiring in 1991.

In retirement he became Marshal of the Diplomatic Corps and a Trustee of the UK arm of the World Wide Fund for Nature. Sir James also served as Warden of Box Hill School, a public school in Mickleham, near Dorking in Surrey, England until his death.

Weatherall was made a Knight Commander of the Order of the British Empire (KBE) in the 1989 Birthday Honours and appointed a Knight Commander of the Royal Victorian Order (KCVO) in the 2001 New Year Honours.

== Family ==
In 1962 Weatherall married Hon. Jean Stewart Macpherson, daughter of Niall Macpherson, 1st Baron Drumalbyn; they had two sons and three daughters. She died on 15 December 2021.

Military offices
Preceded by Sir Richard Thomas	Deputy Supreme Allied Commander Atlantic; 1989–1991	Succeeded by Sir Peter Woodhead
Diplomatic posts
Preceded by Sir John Richards	Marshal of the Diplomatic Corps; 1992–2001	Succeeded by Sir Anthony Figgis
