= Alan Hotham =

Royal Navy admiral (1876–1965)

Admiral Sir Alan Hotham KCMG CB
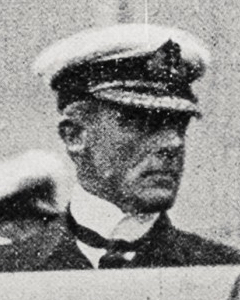
- Hotham pictured in 1922
- Born: Alan Geoffrey Hotham; 3 October 1876; Edinburgh, Midlothian, Scotland
- Died: 10 July 1965 (aged 88); Victoria, London, England
- Burial place: Lennel Kirk; 55.6638°N 2.2280°W
- Military career
- Allegiance: United Kingdom
- Branch: Royal Navy
- Service years: 1890–1929
- Rank: Admiral
- Commands: HMS Aurora; HMS Comus; New Zealand Division; Director of Naval Intelligence
- Conflicts: World War I; Battle of Jutland
- Awards: Order of St Michael and St George; Legion of Honour; Order of the Rising Sun; Order of the Bath
- Cricket career

Cricket information
- Batting: Right-handed
- Bowling: Unknown

Domestic team information
- Years: Team
- 1901: Hampshire
- 1905: Devon

Career statistics
Competition	First-class
Matches	1
Runs scored	16
Batting average	8.00
100s/50s	–/–
Top score	11
Balls bowled	6
Wickets	0
Bowling average	–
5 wickets in innings	–
10 wickets in match	–
Best bowling	–
Catches/stumpings	–/–
- Source: Cricinfo, 2 January 2010

Admiral Sir Alan Geoffrey Hotham KCMG CB (3 October 1876 — 10 July 1965) was a Royal Navy officer and a Scottish first-class cricketer. Graduating from the Britannia Royal Naval College in 1892, Hotham served in the Royal Navy until 1929, seeing action in the First World War, serving as the Director of Naval Intelligence, and rising to the rank of admiral. He also played first-class cricket for Hampshire in 1901, and minor counties cricket for Devon in 1905.

== Naval career ==
=== Early career and WWI service ===
The youngest son of the Admiral of the Fleet Sir Charles Hotham, he was born in Edinburgh, Midlothian on 3 October 1876. He joined the Royal Navy in 1890, studied at HMS Britannia at Dartmouth, Devon from 1890 to 1891, was rated midshipman in 1892 and promoted acting sub-lieutenant in 1895, and was confirmed in that rank in October 1896. While based at HMNB Portsmouth, Hotham made a single appearance in first-class cricket for Hampshire against Lancashire at Portsmouth in the 1901 County Championship. Batting twice in the match, he was dismissed for 5 runs in Hampshire's first innings by Sidney Webb, while in their second innings he was dismissed for 11 runs by Arthur Mold. By September 1902, he was a lieutenant posted as a gunnery officer to the protected cruiser HMS Isis, based at HMNB Devonport. There, Hotham played minor counties cricket for Devon in the 1905 Minor Counties Championship, making one appearance against Glamorgan at Exeter. A knee injury would put an end to his playing participation in later years.

Hotham was promoted to commander in January 1907, with promotion to captain following in June 1913. Soon after ascending to the rank, he was placed in command of the newly constructed cruiser HMS Aurora. He was appointed to the ship six weeks before the outbreak of the First World War, and in 1915 he was selected to command the C-class light cruiser HMS Comus, which was part of Admiral Jellicoe's Grand Fleet. Whilst commanding Comus, Hotham took part in the Battle of Jutland in May 1916. For his actions in the battle, Hotham was mentioned in despatches and recommended for a commendation. In December 1916, he was appointed assistant director of Naval Equipment, but in October 1917 he was reappointed as Director of the Trade Division at the Admiralty Naval Staff.

=== Post-war service ===
After the conclusion of the war, Hotham was appointed a Companion of the Order of St Michael and St George in the 1919 Birthday Honours. His wartime service was also honoured by France, when he was made an Officer of the Legion of Honour in December 1919, and by the Empire of Japan, who conferred upon Hotham the Order of the Rising Sun, 3rd Class. He was appointed Commodore Commanding the New Zealand Division in May 1920, and First Naval Member of the New Zealand Naval Board. Hotham was made an aide-de-camp to George V in November 1922, while in the 1923 Birthday Honours, he was made a Companion of the Order of the Bath, in recognition of valuable services rendered in organising, recruiting, and training for the New Zealand Division, and as naval adviser to the New Zealand Government. His appointment in New Zealand expired in July 1923, when he returned to the Admiralty to become director of Naval Intelligence Division in the autumn of 1923. With this appointment, he was promoted to rear admiral. He remained in this post until 1927 and retired from active service in 1929. Whilst on the retired list, he was promoted to admiral in December 1932.

== Later life ==
After retiring from the navy, Hotham became a member of Port of London Authority in 1929 and remained so until 1959. He also served on the West India Committee from 1928 and was one of its oldest members by the 1960s. Hotham was Gentleman Usher of the Blue Rod between 1934 and 1959; in this capacity he was present at the Coronation of Queen Elizabeth II in 1953. He had a keen interest in Test and county cricket into his final years, regularly attending matches at Lord's. Hotham died on 10 July 1965 at Victoria, London. His funeral service took place at St Mary & All Souls Church in Coldstream, Berwickshire, with his burial occurring in the nearby Lennel Kirkyard on the Scottish bank of the River Tweed.

Military offices
Preceded by New Post	Commodore, New Zealand Squadron and First Naval Member, New Zealand Naval Board; 1921–1923	Succeeded by Alister Beal
Preceded by Maurice Fitzmaurice	Director of Naval Intelligence; 1924–1927	Succeeded by William Fisher
Court offices
Preceded by Sir Reginald Laurence Antrobus	Gentleman Usher of the Blue Rod; 1934–1959	Succeeded by Sir George Beresford-Stooke
