= Charles Gray (diplomat) =

British diplomat

Charles Gray CMG LVO

Ambassador of the United Kingdom to Morocco
- In office 2005 – 2008
- Preceded by: Haydon Warren-Gash
- Succeeded by: Timothy Morris

Marshal of the Diplomatic Corps
- In office 2008 – 2014
- Preceded by: Anthony Figgis
- Succeeded by: Alistair Harrison

Personal details
- Born: John Charles Rodger Gray; 1953 (age 72–73)
- Education: University of Glasgow

John Charles Rodger Gray CMG LVO (born 1953) is a former British diplomat who served as Marshal of the Diplomatic Corps.

Gray was educated at the University of Glasgow before joining the British Diplomatic Service in 1974. After two years at the Foreign and Commonwealth Office he was posted to Warsaw in 1976. Gray served as head of the Middle East Department between 2002 and 2004. He was invested as a Companion of the Order of St Michael and St George in 2003 for services in connection with the 2003 invasion of Iraq. From 2005 to 2008 Gray was British Ambassador to Morocco, before serving as Marshal of the Diplomatic Corps between 2008 and 2014. On 17 December 2013 he was invested as a Lieutenant of the Royal Victorian Order.
