= John Margetson =

British diplomat (1927–2020)

Sir John William Denys Margetson KCMG (9 October 1927 – 17 October 2020) was a British diplomat who served as ambassador to Vietnam, the United Nations, and the Netherlands.

== Early life ==
Margetson was the younger son of the Very Rev. William Margetson and Marion Jenoure. He was educated at Blundell's School and St John's College, Cambridge, where he was a choral scholar. From 1947 to 1949, Margetson served his National Service with the Life Guards regiment of the Household Cavalry.

== Diplomatic career ==
Following his period of National Service Margetson joined the Colonial Service and later the Diplomatic Service where he was speech writer to the Foreign Secretary, George Brown, 1966–68.

Margetson's later career included appointments as British Ambassador to Vietnam 1978–80, deputy Permanent Representative to the United Nations (with rank of ambassador) 1983–84, and ambassador to the Netherlands 1984–88. He was appointed CMG in 1979 and knighted KCMG in 1986.

Following his retirement from the Foreign Office, Margetson devoted himself to various charities and was chairman of the Royal School of Church Music 1988–94, of the Yehudi Menuhin School 1990–94, and of the joint committee that manages the Royal College of Music and the Royal Academy of Music 1991–94. He served as Gentleman Usher of the Blue Rod from 24 July 1992 – 25 October 2002.

== Personal life and death ==
In 1963, Margetson married Miranda, daughter of Sir William Coldstream. They had a son and a daughter.

Margetson died on 17 October 2020, at the age of 93.

Diplomatic posts
Preceded by Robert Tesh	Ambassador to Vietnam; 1978–1980	Succeeded by Derek Tonkin
Preceded by Sir Philip Mansfield	Ambassador to The Netherlands; 1984–1988	Succeeded by Sir Michael Jenkins
Court offices
Preceded by Sir John Moreton	Gentleman Usher of the Blue Rod; 1992–2002	Succeeded by Sir Anthony Figgis
