= Gentleman Usher of the Blue Rod =

List of members of a British order of chivalry

The usher of the Blue Rod, formally known as the Gentleman Usher of the Blue Rod or Lady Usher of the Blue Rod is the Usher to the Most Distinguished Order of Saint Michael and Saint George, established in 1818.

The office was simply designated as that of "Officer of Arms" to the Order from the first appointment in 1882 until 1911, when it received the present name.

== Officers of Arms of the Order of St Michael and St George (1882–1911) ==
- 1882–1901: Frederick Obadiah Adrian, CMG
- 1901–1911: Sir William Alexander Baillie-Hamilton, KCMG, CB

== Gentlemen/Lady Ushers of the Blue Rod (1911–present) ==
- 1911–1920: Sir William Alexander Baillie Hamilton, KCMG, CB
- 1920–1934: Sir Reginald Laurence Antrobus, KCMG, CB
- 1934–1959: Admiral Sir Alan Hotham, CB, CMG
- 1959–1972: Sir George Beresford-Stooke, KCMG
- 1972–1979: Sir Anthony Abell, KCMG
- 1979–1992: Sir John Moreton, KCMG, KCVO, MC
- 1992–2002: Sir John Margetson, KCMG
- 2002–2016: Sir Anthony Figgis, KCVO, CMG
- 2016–2025: Dame DeAnne Julius, DCMG, CBE
- 2025–present: Sir Jonathan Taylor, KCMG
