= Roger Du Boulay =

British diplomat (1922–2020)

Sir Roger William Houssemayne Du Boulay KCVO CMG (20 March 1922 – 14 April 2020) was a British diplomat who served as Vice-Marshal of the Diplomatic Corps.

== Biography ==
Du Boulay was educated at Winchester College and New College, Oxford. On 6 November 1942, he was commissioned into the Royal Air Force Volunteer Reserve, and saw active service in the Second World War. On 28 February 1947, he was promoted to Flight Lieutenant. He relinquished his commission on 28 February 1957.

After the war Du Boulay joined the Colonial Service, and served in Nigeria between 1949 and 1958. In 1959 he joined Her Majesty's Diplomatic Service, and held appointments in Washington, the Foreign Office, Manila and Paris. From 1973 to 1975 he was Resident Commissioner of the New Hebrides. He was made a Companion of the Order of St Michael and St George in the 1975 Birthday Honours. On 12 December 1975 he became Vice-Marshal of the Diplomatic Corps, retaining the post until 9 April 1982. He was knighted in the Royal Victorian Order in 1982, having been made a CVO in 1972. He later served as an adviser to the Solomon Islands and Swaziland governments.

He died in April 2020 at the age of 98.
