= DeAnne Julius =

American–British economist

Dame DeAnne Julius DCMG CBE
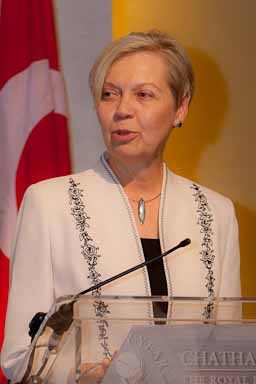
- DeAnne Julius at the Chatham House Prize award ceremony in 2010

Lady Usher of the Blue Rod
- Incumbent
- Assumed office 2016
- Monarchs: Elizabeth II; Charles III
- Preceded by: Sir Anthony Figgis

Personal details
- Born: April 14, 1949 (age 77) United States
- Education: Iowa State University (B.S); University of California, Davis (MA, Ph.D.)
- Occupation: Economist

Dame DeAnne Shirley Julius, DCMG, CBE (born April 14, 1949) is a Distinguished Fellow at Chatham House. An American–British economist, Julius is noted as a founder member of the Monetary Policy Committee of the Bank of England.

She began her active career as a project economist with the World Bank in Washington and has handled extensive roles in the private sector. From 2003 to 2012 she was Chairman of Chatham House in London and from 2014 to 2019 was chair of the Council at University College London.

== Early life and education ==
Julius was born the daughter of Marvin and Maxine Julius, and was raised in Ames, Iowa.

She earned a BSc degree in economics from Iowa State University, and an MA degree and a PhD degree in economics from the University of California, Davis. She holds five honorary doctorates, from the University of Warwick, University of Birmingham, South Bank University, University of Bath, and Iowa State University.

== Career ==
After graduating, Julius began her career at the CIA as an economic analyst from 1970 to 1971. In 1975, after earning her doctorate, she went on to work as a project economist with the World Bank in Washington, D.C.

From 1986 to 1997, she held a succession of posts, including chief economist at British Airways and Royal Dutch Shell. From September 1997 to May 2001, she was a full-time member of the Monetary Policy Committee of the Bank of England, and sat on the Court of the Bank of England until May 2004. She chaired HM Treasury's banking services consumer codes review group in 2000–2001 and the Public Services Industry Review in 2007–2008 for the UK Department for Business, Enterprise and Regulatory Reform.

She was a non-executive director on the boards of Lloyds Bank and Serco Group from 2001 to 2007, BP from 2001 to 2011, Roche Holdings SA from 2002 to 2016, Jones Lang LaSalle from 2008 to 2019, Deloitte LLP from 2011 to 2014 and ICE Benchmark Administration from 2016 to 2019. Julius was the Chairman of Chatham House, formally known as the Royal Institute of International Affairs, from 2003 to 2012. From 2014 to 2019, she was chair of the Council of University College London.

== Board memberships and honours ==
Julius has served on a number of corporate boards, as listed above. She has also been a member of the International Advisory Boards of Temasek from 2010 to 2017, the China Investment Corporation from 2016 to 2020 and Rock Creek Global from 2004.

She was appointed Commander of the Order of the British Empire (CBE) in 2002 and Dame Commander of the Order of St Michael and St George (DCMG) in the 2013 New Year Honours for services to international relations.

Julius was appointed Usher of the Blue Rod of the Most Distinguished Order of Saint Michael and Saint George on February 11, 2016.

== Personal life ==
Julius is married to Ian Alexander Harvey, formerly chief executive of BTG. She has written five books and academic papers on subjects ranging from foreign direct investment to strategic planning and corporate governance.

Court offices
Preceded by Sir Anthony Figgis	Lady Usher of the Blue Rod; 2016–2025	Succeeded by Sir Jonathan Taylor
