= George Abell =

George Abell may refer to:

- George O. Abell (1927–1983), American astronomer and educator
- Sir George Abell (civil servant) (1904–1989), English civil servant in UK and colonial Indian service and cricketer

== See also ==
- George Abel (1916–1996), Canadian ice-hockey player
- George Clayton Abel (1909–1977), Royal Canadian Air Force officer
- Abell (disambiguation)
