= John Moreton =

British diplomat

Sir John Oscar Moreton KCMG KCVO MC (28 December 1917 – 14 October 2012) was a British diplomat.

== Early life ==
Moreton born in Oakham, Rutland, and was educated at St Edward's School, Oxford and Trinity College, Oxford. He served in the Royal Artillery during the Second World War, and was awarded the Military Cross in 1944, following the Battle of Kohima.

== Diplomatic career ==
Moreton joined the Diplomatic Service in 1946. After postings to Kenya (1953–55) and Nigeria (1961–64), he served as Ambassador of the United Kingdom to Vietnam from 1969 to 1971. He was then the High Commissioner to Malta from 1972 to 1974, and between 1975 and 1977, served in the United States, first as Deputy Permanent Representative in the UK Mission to the United Nations in New York, and then as Minister in Washington, the deputy to the Ambassador.

He was appointed CMG in 1966 and KCMG in 1978, and KCVO in 1976.

Following his retirement, Moreton served as Gentleman Usher of the Blue Rod from 19 October 1979 – 24 July 1992.

Diplomatic posts
Preceded by Murray MacLehose	British Ambassador to Vietnam; 1969–1971	Succeeded by Brooks Richards
Court offices
Preceded by Sir Anthony Abell	Gentleman Usher of the Blue Rod; 1979–1992	Succeeded by Sir John Margetson
