= Jonathan Taylor (civil servant) =

English banker (born 1955)

Sir Jonathan Taylor (born March 1955) is a former HM Treasury official and banker who has served as Gentleman Usher of the Blue Rod since 2025.

== Early life and education ==
Jonathan McLeod Grigor Taylor was born in March 1955. His father was a British diplomat and his mother was Australian. From the age of eight years, he was sent to board at Dunhurst, the preparatory school attached to Bedales, where he stayed on to take A levels in English, history and economics. He read philosophy, politics and economics (PPE) at the University of Oxford between 1974 and 1977, and received a postgraduate diploma in environment and sustainability from Birkbeck College in 2021.

== Career ==
Taylor joined HM Treasury in 1977. He was twice seconded to the Finance Section of the UK Representation to the EU (UKREP) in Brussels. After leaving the Treasury to work for UBS as a managing director and then director general of the London Investment Banking Association, he returned to the Treasury as director-general of financial services and stability. Taylor was vice president of the European Investment Bank from 2013 to 2018, where he led the growth and development of the Bank's climate and environmental business.

Taylor was appointed non-executive director at the Scottish National Investment Bank at its establishment in 2020, and stepped down at the end of 2026. He is a senior adviser with European public affairs consultancy Afore Consulting. He was appointed Chair of the Green Finance Institute in July 2025.

Also in 2025, Taylor was appointed Gentleman Usher of the Blue Rod, an officer of the Most Distinguished Order of St Michael and St George, replacing DeAnne Julius. Since 2024, he has been a trustee of the Chapel Maintenance Fund of the Order.

== Recognition ==
Taylor was knighted for services to investment and the economy in the 2019 Birthday Honours.

Taylor was a member of the winning team, the Strigiformes, in series 18 (2022/2023) of the BBC2 television quiz show Only Connect . The team went on to contest the Champion of Champions special, aired on 2 January 2025. Three of the team members had previously represented Birkbeck, University of London in the 50th series of University Challenge, which aired from 2020 to 2021. It was named after the taxonomic order Strigiformes, which contains owls, the Birkbeck emblem.
