= John Monck (courtier) =

Sir John Berkeley Monck GCVO CMG (18 December 1883 – 31 March 1964) was Marshal of the Diplomatic Corps in the Royal Household of the Sovereign of the United Kingdom from 1945 to 1950.

== Life ==
He was the son of William Berkeley Monck of Coley Park, Mayor of Reading, Berkshire in 1888, and his wife Althea Pauline Louise Fanshawe. He was educated at Eton College.

Monck was His Majesty's Assistant Marshal 1920 to 1936, then His Majesty's Vice-Marshal of the Diplomatic Corps 1936 to 1945, and acting Marshal 1939 to 1945, when Lieutenant-General Sir George Clive was on war duty. In 1952 he became an Extra Gentleman Usher in the Household of Queen Elizabeth II.
