= Murray MacLehose, Baron MacLehose of Beoch =

British politician, the 25th Governor of Hong Kong (1917–2000)

The Right Honourable The Lord MacLehose of Beoch KT GBE KCMG KCVO DL

25th Governor of Hong Kong
- In office 19 November 1971 – 8 May 1982
- Monarch: Elizabeth II
- Colonial Secretary: Hugh Norman-Walker; Denys Roberts
- Chief Secretary: Denys Roberts; Jack Cater; Philip Haddon-Cave
- Preceded by: David Trench
- Succeeded by: Edward Youde

Member of the House of Lords
- Lord Temporal
- Life peerage 21 May 1982 – 27 May 2000
Diplomatic positions
British Ambassador to Denmark
In office 1969–1971
| Preceded by | Oliver Wright |
| Succeeded by | Andrew Stark |
British Ambassador to Vietnam
In office 1967–1969
| Preceded by | Peter Wilkinson |
| Succeeded by | John Moreton |

Personal details
- Born: 16 October 1917 Glasgow, Scotland
- Died: 27 May 2000 (aged 82) Ayrshire, Scotland
- Resting place: Alloway Parish Church, Scotland
- Education: Balliol College, Oxford
- Profession: Diplomat, colonial administrator

Chinese name
- Traditional Chinese: 麥理浩
- Simplified Chinese: 麦理浩
Transcriptions
Standard Mandarin
- Hanyu Pinyin: Mài Lǐhào
Yue: Cantonese
- Yale Romanization: Mahk Léih houh
- Jyutping: Mak^{6} Lei^{5} hou^{6}

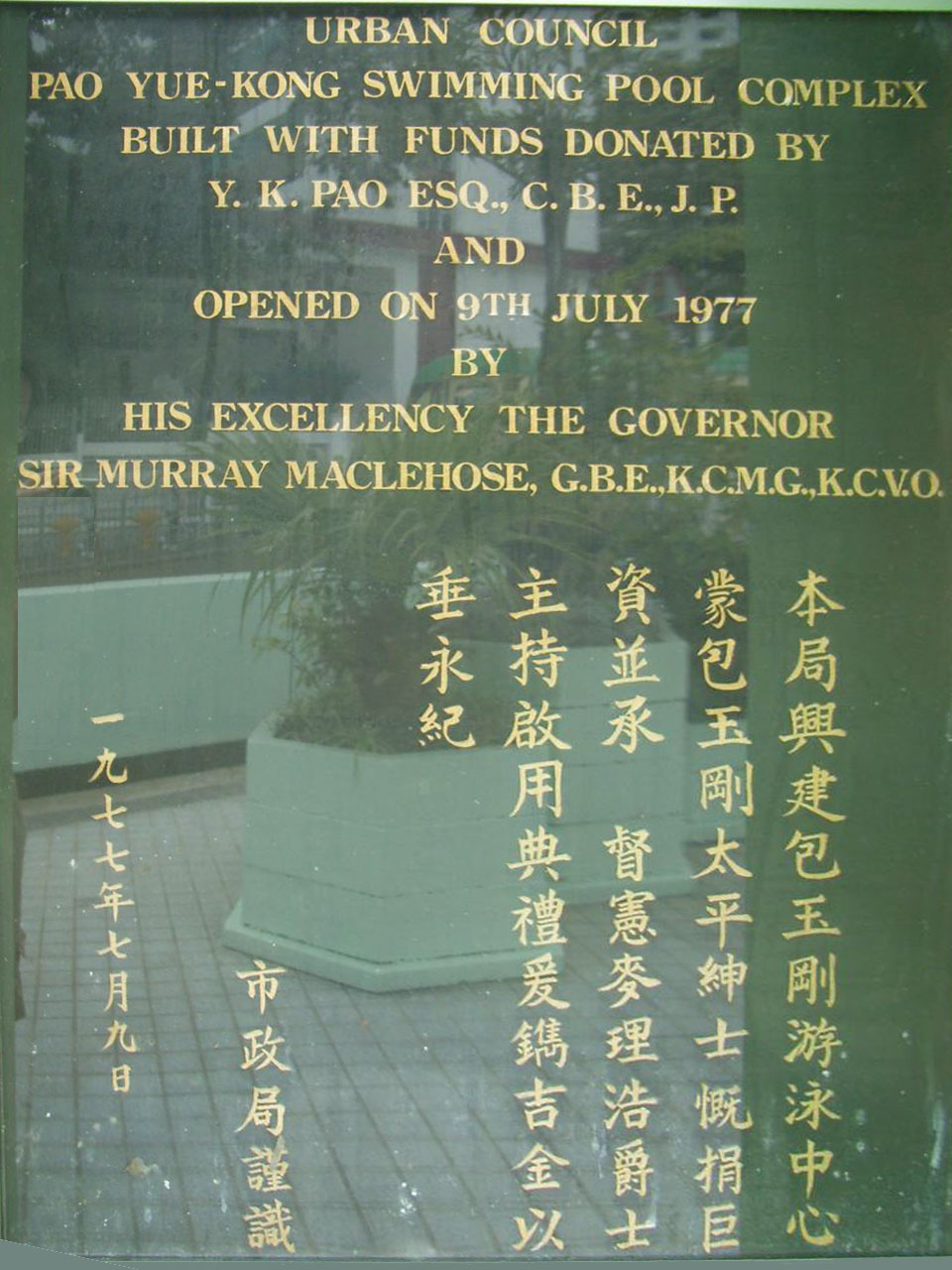
A foundation stone laid by Sir Murray MacLehose, in Pao Yue-Kong Swimming pool, Hong Kong

Crawford Murray MacLehose, Baron MacLehose of Beoch, KT, GBE, KCMG, KCVO, DL (Chinese: 麥理浩; 16 October 1917 – 27 May 2000), was a British politician, diplomat and colonial official who served as the 25th Governor of Hong Kong, from 1971 to 1982. He was the longest-serving governor of the colony, with four successive terms in office. He previously worked for the British Council in China and was the British ambassador to South Vietnam and Denmark.

Although MacLehose came from a diplomatic background and lacked colonial administrative experience, he was generally regarded as one of the most successful and popular governors of Hong Kong due to the number of social reforms enacted during his time and for Hong Kong's economic success during his time in office. Although his tenure as governor finished before formal British-Sino negotiations over Hong Kong commenced, he sought to improve diplomatic relations with China and held talks with Deng Xiaoping.

== Early life and career ==
Murray MacLehose was born in Glasgow, Scotland, on 16 October 1917, the second child of Hamish Alexander MacLehose who owned a printing business and Margaret Bruce Black. He was born whilst his father was away serving with the 8th Battalion of the Scottish Rifles during the First World War. MacLehose attended Rugby School in 1931 and Balliol College, Oxford where he read modern history.

After graduating he began working for the colonial administrative government in British Malaya in 1939 before being temporarily transferred to British consulate in Xiamen in 1940 to learn Hokkien which was widely spoken in northern Malaya. During World War II, while under the cover of being the British vice-consul, MacLehose trained Chinese guerrillas to operate behind Japanese lines to carry out sabotage. He was detained by the Japanese army in December 1941 before being repatriated back to Britain in 1942. He returned to China to work with British naval intelligence. During one episode, he reportedly walked into a club in Shantou controlled by the Japanese army where he calmly ordered a gin and tonic before leaving without obstruction. In May 1944 he met British scientist and historian Joseph Needham.

MacLehose was appointed to the Order of the British Empire by the British government in 1946 for his wartime service.

== Diplomatic career ==
At the end of the Second World War, MacLehose served as the British Acting Consul in Fuzhou before becoming Consul General for the British Foreign Office in Hankou in 1948. He developed a keen interest in Chinese culture and learned to speak Mandarin. MacLehose returned to Britain in 1950 in the aftermath of the Chinese Civil War in which the Chinese Communist Party took power.

MacLehose was seconded to the High Commission of the United Kingdom, Wellington in 1954 and was principal private secretary to Foreign Secretary George Brown in the late 1960s. In this role he helped to oversee the integration of the British Colonial Office into the Foreign Office.

In 1967, he was appointed the British ambassador to South Vietnam and held the role until 1969. His career was almost stalled when he left a copy of a confidential telegram in a bank in 1967. The document contained correspondence between then British Prime Minister Harold Wilson and US President Lyndon Johnson concerning the Vietnam War. Another British diplomat was able to recover the telegram before its contents could be leaked. Upon being informed of the potential security breach, Wilson and Brown decided against allowing an investigation into MacLehose's error out of appreciation of his abilities and record. This decision likely saved his career, and allowed MacLehose to proceed to his next post as British ambassador to the Republic of Vietnam in 1967.

Between this time and 1971, MacLehose served in the British Embassy in Beijing and briefly as the Ambassador to Denmark.

== Governor of Hong Kong ==
MacLehose became Governor of Hong Kong in November 1971. He held the position until May 1982, making him Hong Kong's longest-serving governor: his 10 years and 6 months in office exceeded Sir Alexander Grantham's record by one month. He was widely and affectionately known as "Jock the Sock", in reference both to his Scottish heritage and to his name, 'hose' being a word meaning sock or stocking.

MacLehose was appointed Governor shortly after the 1967 Hong Kong riots due to his diplomatic background in Asia, perceived skill at political problems, and because the British government felt he lacked colonial baggage. MacLehose surmised that Hong Kong had already established economic capacity, and the time had come to reform Hong Kong's social policies.

MacLehose, who stood well over six feet tall, avoided wearing his gubernatorial uniform, which made him ill at ease but wore a traditional colonial office uniform when he was sworn in as Governor by Hugh Selby Norman-Walker.

A diplomat with a British Labour Party background, MacLehose introduced a wide range of reforms during his time in office that laid the foundation of Hong Kong as a cohesive, self-aware society. He had Chinese recognised as an official language for communication, alongside English. He greatly expanded welfare and set up a massive public housing programme. Under intense public pressure, he created the ICAC to root out corruption. By establishing the District Boards, he greatly improved government accountability. He oversaw the construction of the Mass Transit Railway, Hong Kong's transportation backbone, and other major infrastructure projects. On his watch, community and arts facilities were expanded, and public campaigns, such as against litter and violent crime, were introduced.

These changes required approval from the UK Government Treasury for increased expenditure, and it was against some opposition that, in his first two years in office, Hong Kong government expenditure grew by over 50%.

In private, MacLehose was a supporter of gay rights and was urged by activist Elsie Tu and members of the Hong Kong Anglican Church to reform laws that made homosexual acts illegal in line with international human rights standards. However, MacLehose chose not to change the laws out of concern that it would be met with hostility by the more socially conservative Chinese population. Homosexuality was later decriminalized in Hong Kong by the British administration and Legislative Council in 1991.

MacLehose was convinced China would eventually reclaim Hong Kong and opposed any significant move towards constitutional democracy in Hong Kong.

Under MacLehose's tenure, Hong Kong faced significant problems with illegal immigration from mainland China due to political turmoil following the Chinese Cultural Revolution. MacLehose issued the Immigration Ordinance of 1971 which mandated only those who have lived in Hong Kong for seven years can be issued a Hong Kong permanent resident identity card. He also initiated the "catch and release" policy of deciding to repatriate all captured illegal immigrants to China. MacLehose also listed 24 to 26 October 1979 as a three-day grace period to allow illegal immigrants who had already come to Hong Kong to apply for Hong Kong identity cards while police and border patrols with the mainland were intensified. His tenure also saw the arrival of Vietnamese boat people following the Fall of Saigon. MacLehose found sites across Hong Kong to set up twelve refugee centers, which were jointly managed by the Hong Kong government and the United Nations High Commissioner for Refugees. After MacLehose left office, the Vietnamese refugee problem continued to plague Hong Kong. Although the Hong Kong government later announced the implementation of a "lockdown policy" in July 1982 to prevent refugees from leaving refugee centers and reduce the impact of refugees on society. The refugee camps remained in operation until the Government of the Hong Kong Special Administrative Region closed the final camp in 2000.

=== Other notable policies ===
Other major policies introduced during the MacLehose era included:

- The introduction of nine years of compulsory education.
- The introduction of the Ten-year Housing Programme in 1972 to alleviate housing problems.
- The establishment of satellite 'new towns', such as Sha Tin and Tuen Mun.
- The establishment of the Country Parks.
- The introduction and approval of a Labour Ordinance.
- The establishment of the social assistance scheme.
- The construction of the Mass Transit Railway.
- An expansion of community facilities.
- The adoption of Chinese as an official language.
- The introduction of paid holidays.
- An increase in social service provision for the elderly.
- The introduction of infirmity and disability allowances.
- The introduction of redundancy payments for workers.
- The introduction of the Home Ownership Scheme to encourage owner-occupation.
- The introduction of a major rehabilitation programme for the disabled and disadvantaged.
- An increase in the number of schools and hospitals.
- The introduction of Criminal and Law Enforcement Injuries Compensation.
- The introduction of Traffic Accident Victims Assistance.
- The introduction of special needs allowances for the elderly.
- The introduction of sickness allowances for eligible manual and lower-paid non-manual workers.
- The introduction of weekly rest days.
- The introduction of Labour Tribunals.
- The establishment of the Junior Secondary Education Assessment (JSEA) system to increase the number of subsidised places in senior secondary education.
- The establishment of Geotechnical Engineering Office (part of Civil Engineering and Development Department) to ensure safeties of slopes and hillside to avoid further loss of lives due to landslides and slips of Sau Mau Ping in 1972 and 1976.
- The establishment of the Jubilee Sports Centre
- The establishment of the Hong Kong Academy for Performing Arts

=== Relations with China ===
In order to cooperate with the improvement of Sino-British relations, MacLehose took a series of actions to repair the tense relations between China and Hong Kong since the Cultural Revolution and the 7 June riots. MacLehose was the first Governor of Hong Kong to make an official visit to China since the founding of the People's Republic of China. Alexander Grantham had been the first Hong Kong governor had visited Beijing in 1955, but in a private capacity.

=== Hong Kong sovereignty negotiations ===
In 1979, MacLehose raised the question of Britain's 99-year lease of the New Territories (an area that encompasses all territories north of Boundary Street on the Kowloon Peninsula), with Deng Xiaoping. After returning to Hong Kong with the talks, MacLehose wished to avoid a public panic and did not publicly disclose the nature of the talks. He only quoted Deng Xiaoping as "telling Hong Kong investors to rest assured" but abandoned plans to reform Hong Kong's democratic model out of fear of provoking the Chinese government. The talks, although inconclusive at the time, eventually involved top British Government officials and paved the way for the handover of Hong Kong in its entirety, including those parts ceded to the UK in perpetuity, to the People's Republic of China on 1 July 1997.

== Legacy and assessment ==
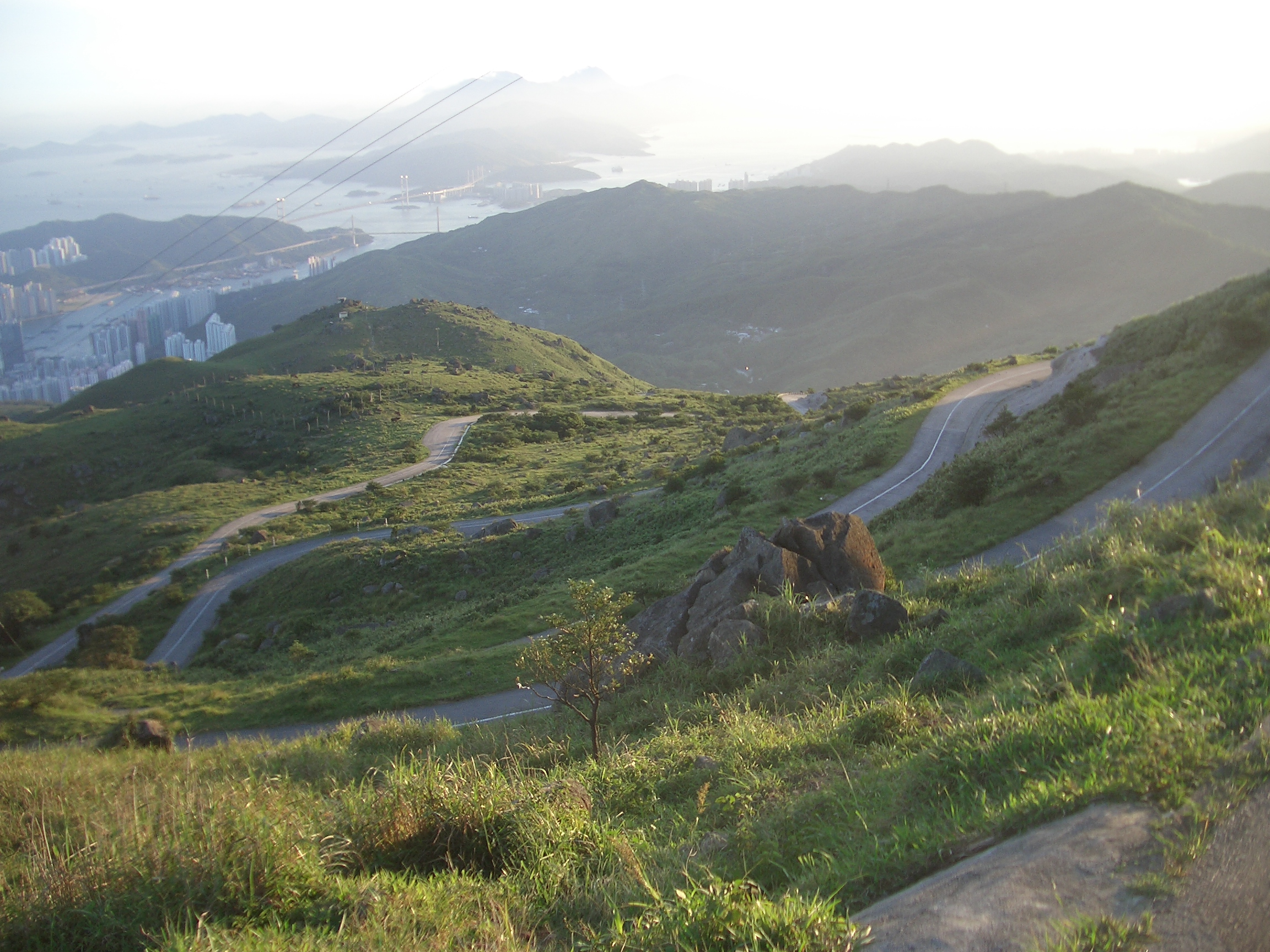
The MacLehose Trail near Tai Mo Shan Road

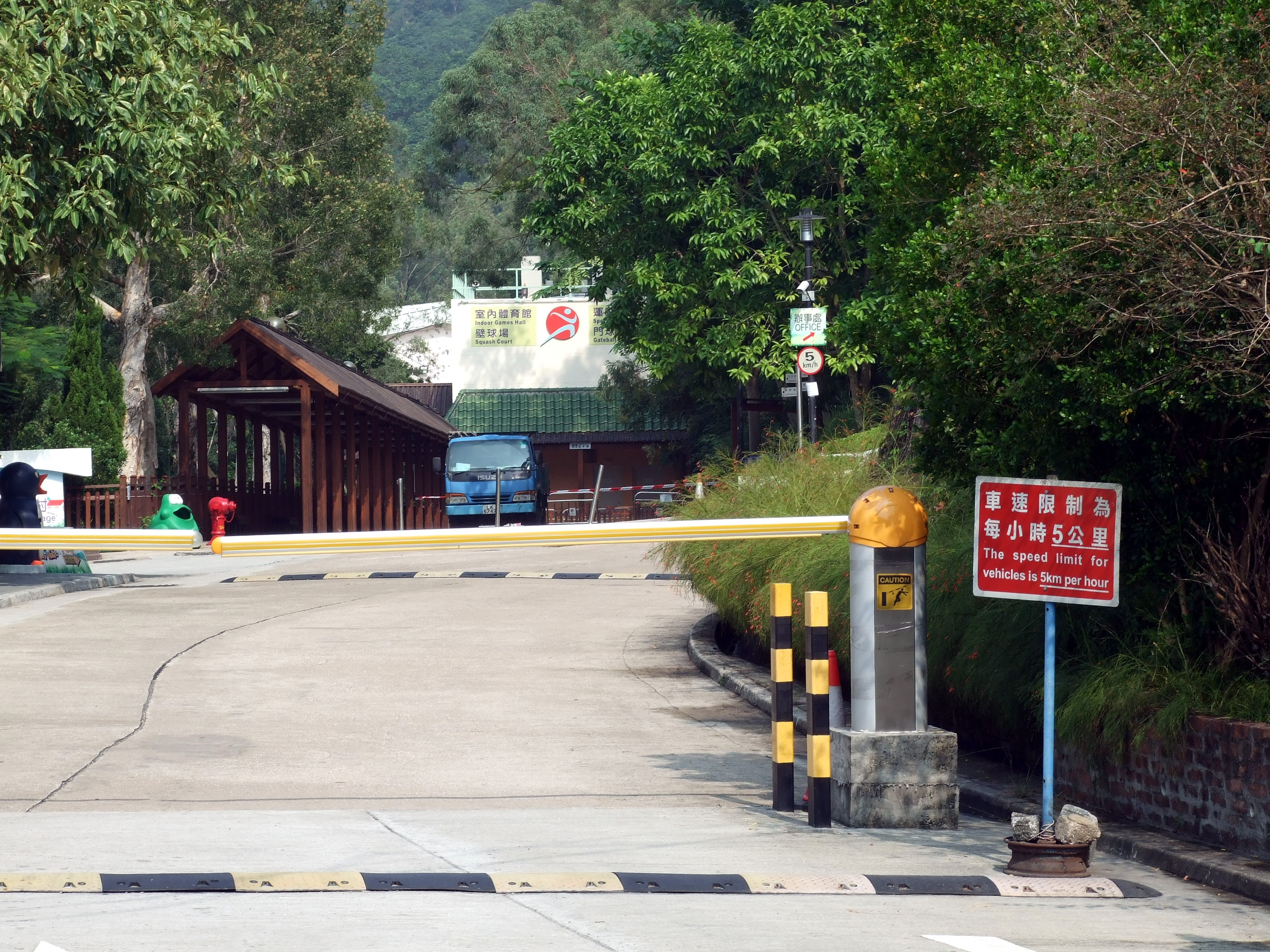
Lady MacLehose Resort, Pak Tam Chung

MacLehose is generally regarded as one of the most beloved governors in Hong Kong's history. His various policies were credited with changing the original appearance of Hong Kong, transforming it from a relatively traditional colony into a rapidly developing large region. He was particularly praised for his efforts to improve education, medical care, public transportation and anti-corruption measures.

When MacLehose finished his term as Governor of Hong Kong in 1982, the South China Morning Post and the chief unofficial member of the Legislative Council Roger Lobo unanimously used the term "MacLehose Era" to describe the entire 1970s and 1980s of Hong Kong under MacLehose's rule. In the early 1990s, it was believed that his more than 10 years as governor of Hong Kong had a profound impact on Hong Kong. In an interview in his later years, MacLehose admitted that during his tenure, he was "committed to rapidly expanding social services and housing supply" in response to the dissatisfaction expressed by citizens during the 1967 leftist riots. He believed that these policies could not only effectively bring the public and the people closer, but also accelerate the modernization of society and was therefore an important and correct policy for Hong Kong. Due to his fondness for hiking and promotion of outdoor pursuits various nature sites and picnic spots were named after him and his wife in Hong Kong, including the MacLehose Trail and the Lady MacLehose Holiday Village in Sai Kung

However, MacLehose's tenure has faced some criticism due to his perceived failure to enact democratic reforms. MacLehose was critical of attempted democratic reforms enacted by Chris Patten in 1994 ahead of the Hong Kong's handover. He believed the "one country, two systems" concept proposed by Xiaoping would fully bring stability to Hong Kong's future, although he admitted to feeling worried ahead of China's assumption of sovereignty of Hong Kong but believed the people of Hong Kong would be resilient enough to work the situation out. Members of Hong Kong's pro-democracy camp have said that although MacLehose improved the relationship between Hong Kong and China, he overly accommodated China during talks with Xiaoping by not negotiating for China to accept democratic autonomy and universal suffrage in Hong Kong as part of the handover deal. Democratic Party politician Martin Lee once criticized MacLehose for not taking the lead in implementing further democratic reforms before China and Britain discussed the handover of Hong Kong and stated that this was a missed opportunity. MacLehose later insisted he did not "give Hong Kong away" to China but admitted out of concern of angering the Chinese government he felt an "obvious sense of powerlessness" in implementing democratic reforms and believed the implementation of universal suffrage for the Hong Kong Legislative Council during his time in office would have intensified conflict between the Chinese Communist Party and the Kuomintang. MacLehose often emphasized that his mission as the Governor of Hong Kong was to ensure that its citizens led a prosperous and peaceful life.

== Post-governorship and later life ==
After his governorship ended in 1982, MacLehose served as a director for NatWest bank from 1982 to 1988. He was made a life peer as Baron MacLehose of Beoch, of Maybole in the District of Kyle and Carrick and of Victoria in Hong Kong, later that year. He sat as a crossbench peer in the House of Lords. In 1983, MacLehose was made a Knight of the Thistle. In 1992 he was awarded an honorary doctorate (LLD) by the University of Hong Kong. When he was 80 years old, he, alongside former Prime Minister Sir Edward Heath and former Deputy Prime Minister and Foreign Secretary Lord Howe, attended the official swearing-in ceremony of the Hong Kong Special Administrative Region's Chief Executive on 1 July 1997, which was boycotted by the British Government.

== Personal life ==
MacLehose married Margaret Noël Dunlop, the daughter of Scottish newspaper proprietor and cricketer Sir Thomas Dunlop in 1947. They had twin daughters born in 1949. One of his daughters Sylvia became an activist for the rights of disabled people after being paralyzed in a car accident and is a member of the Scottish Council on Disability.

Outside of his diplomatic career, MacLehose and his wife had a love of sailing and hiking. In recognition of his fondness for outdoor pursuits. MacLehose was a member of the Athenaeum Club, London. After his retirement he took up farming and shepherding at his property in Maybole.

MacLehose died in Ayrshire, Scotland, on 27 May 2000 at the age of 82. After he died, then Hong Kong Chief Executive Tung Chee-hwa and Chief Secretary for Administration Anson Chan both expressed their sadness. Tung Chee-hwa stated "his passing has caused us to lose a close friend."

== Arms ==
Coat of arms of Murray MacLehose, Baron MacLehose of Beoch
| Crest A Chinese Dragon’s Head erased affrontée Or armed and langued Gules Escutcheon Argent on a Chevron ensigned at the top with a Cross Pattée Sable between two Escutcheons Azure each charged of a Mullet of the first in chief and a Demi Double Headed Eagle displayed Azure beaked Sable in base a Book expanded Argent Supporters Dexter: a Chinese Dragon Or armed and langued Gules gorged of a Collar indented Sable; Sinister: a Black Faced Ram proper Motto "Spe Vitae Melioris" (Hope for a Better Life) |

== Honours and recognition ==
- Member of the Most Excellent Order of the British Empire (MBE) (1946)
- Companion of the Most Distinguished Order of Saint Michael and Saint George (CMG) (1964)
- Knight Commander of the Most Distinguished Order of Saint Michael and Saint George (KCMG) (1971)
- Knight of the Most Venerable Order of the Hospital of St. John of Jerusalem (KStJ) (1972)
- Knight Commander of the Royal Victorian Order (KCVO) (1975)
- Knight Grand Cross of the Most Excellent Order of the British Empire (GBE) (1976)
- Life Peerage (1982) (Barony of MacLehose of Beoch, of Maybole in the District of Kyle and Carrick, and of Victoria in Hong Kong)
- Knight of the Thistle (KT) (1983)
- Honorary Doctor of Laws, University of Hong Kong
- The 100-kilometre MacLehose Trail, stretching from Sai Kung Peninsula to Tuen Mun in the New Territories, was named after him (Maclehose was an enthusiastic hiker)
- The MacLehose Medical Rehabilitation Centre, the MacLehose Dental Centre, the Lady MacLehose Holiday Village, and the Sir Murray MacLehose Trust Fund was also named to commemorate him or his wife

Diplomatic posts
| Preceded by Sir Nicholas Henderson | Principal Private Secretary to the Foreign Secretary; 1965–1967 | Succeeded by Sir Donald Maitland |
| Preceded by Sir Peter Wilkinson | British Ambassador to Vietnam; 1967–1969 | Succeeded by Sir John Moreton |
| Preceded by Sir Oliver Wright | British Ambassador to Denmark; 1969–1971 | Succeeded by Sir Andrew Stark |
| Preceded by Sir David Trench | Governor and Commander-in-Chief, Hong Kong; 1971–1982 | Succeeded by Sir Edward Youde |
