= Reginald Antrobus =

English civil servant

Sir Reginald Laurence Antrobus KCMG CB
- photographed by Walter Stoneman around 1916

Senior Crown Agent for the Colonies
- In office 1909–1918
- Preceded by: Ernest Edward Blake

Assistant Under-Secretary of State for the Colonies
- In office 1898–1909
- Succeeded by: George Fiddes

Acting Governor of Saint Helena
- In office 1889–1890
- Preceded by: William Grey-Wilson
- Succeeded by: William Grey-Wilson

Personal details
- Born: 5 September 1853 Withyham
- Died: 29 July 1942 (aged 88) 13 Cranley Gardens, London
- Spouse: Selina Jane Irwin (m. 1880; died 1900) Edith Marion Robinson (m. 1894)
- Children: 6
- Parent(s): Rev. George Antrobus; Henrietta née Gream
- Education: Winchester College; New College, Oxford

Sir Reginald Laurence Antrobus, KCMG CB (1853–1942) was a civil servant in the British Colonial Office. He rose to the position of Assistant Under-Secretary of State in 1898 and his final position was as a Senior Crown Agent.

He was born in Withyham on 5 September 1853 and educated at Winchester College and New College, Oxford with scholarships for both. He read classics and did well, with a first in Honour Moderations. He then sat the new civil service examinations introduced following the Northcote–Trevelyan Report and came second in his year.

He joined the Colonial Office as a clerk and then served as the private secretary to a series of permanent under-secretaries and four Secretaries of State: John Wodehouse, 1st Earl of Kimberley, Edward Stanley, 15th Earl of Derby, Frederick Stanley, 16th Earl of Derby and Granville Leveson-Gower, 2nd Earl Granville.

He married Selina Jane Irwin in 1880 and they had two daughters but she died in 1890.

His second wife was Edith Marian Robinson. They married in 1894 and had two sons and two daughters. She was honoured as Dame in 1927 for her charitable work for the Overseas Nursing Association. She died in a nursing home in London on 9 September 1944.

After retiring as a Crown Agent in 1918, he served the Church of England in several ways – as a member of its national assembly and central board of finance and as a director of the Church Schools Company. He was the Gentleman Usher of the Blue Rod from 1920 to 1934. And he researched his family's history which was published as Antrobus Pedigrees: the Story of a Cheshire Family in 1929.

He died at his home in Kensington on 29 July 1942.

Court offices
Preceded by William A. Baillie-Hamilton	Gentleman Usher of the Blue Rod; 1920–1934	Succeeded by Alan Hotham
