= List of ambassadors of the United Kingdom to Vietnam =

The ambassador of the United Kingdom to the Socialist Republic of Vietnam is the United Kingdom's foremost diplomatic representative in Vietnam, and head of the UK's diplomatic mission in Hanoi.

The list below shows British ambassadors to the Republic of Vietnam (South Vietnam) at its capital, Saigon (now Ho Chi Minh City), from 1954 after the Geneva Conference which separated French Indochina into its component states of Laos, Cambodia and Vietnam and temporarily partitioned Vietnam (although the Geneva agreement was not accepted by South Vietnam) until 1975 when North and South Vietnam were reunified. During that period the British government maintained a consulate-general in Hanoi. The British embassy is now in Hanoi with a consulate-general in Ho Chi Minh City.

== Ambassadors ==
- 1954–1955: Sir Hubert Graves
- 1954–1957: Sir Hugh Stephenson
- 1957–1960: Sir Roderick Parkes
- 1960–1963: Henry Hohler
- 1963–1966: Gordon Etherington-Smith
- 1966–1967: Sir Peter Wilkinson
- 1967–1969: Lord MacLehose
- 1969–1971: Sir John Moreton
- 1972–1974: Brooks Richards
- 1974–1975: John Bushell
- 1975–1976: John Stewart
- 1976–1978: Robert Tesh
- 1978–1980: Sir John Margetson
- 1980–1982: Derek Tonkin
- 1982–1985: Sir Michael Pike
- 1985–1987: Richard Tallboys
- 1987–1990: Emrys Thomas Davies
- 1990–1997: Peter Keegan Williams
- 1997–2000: David Fall
- 2000–2003: Warwick Morris
- 2003–2007: Robert A. E. Gordon
- 2008–2010: Mark Kent
- 2010–2014: Antony Stokes
- 2014–2018: Giles Lever
- 2018–2022: Gareth Ward
- 2022–2026: Iain Frew
