= Marshal of the Diplomatic Corps =

Royal liaison to the United Kingdom's diplomatic corps

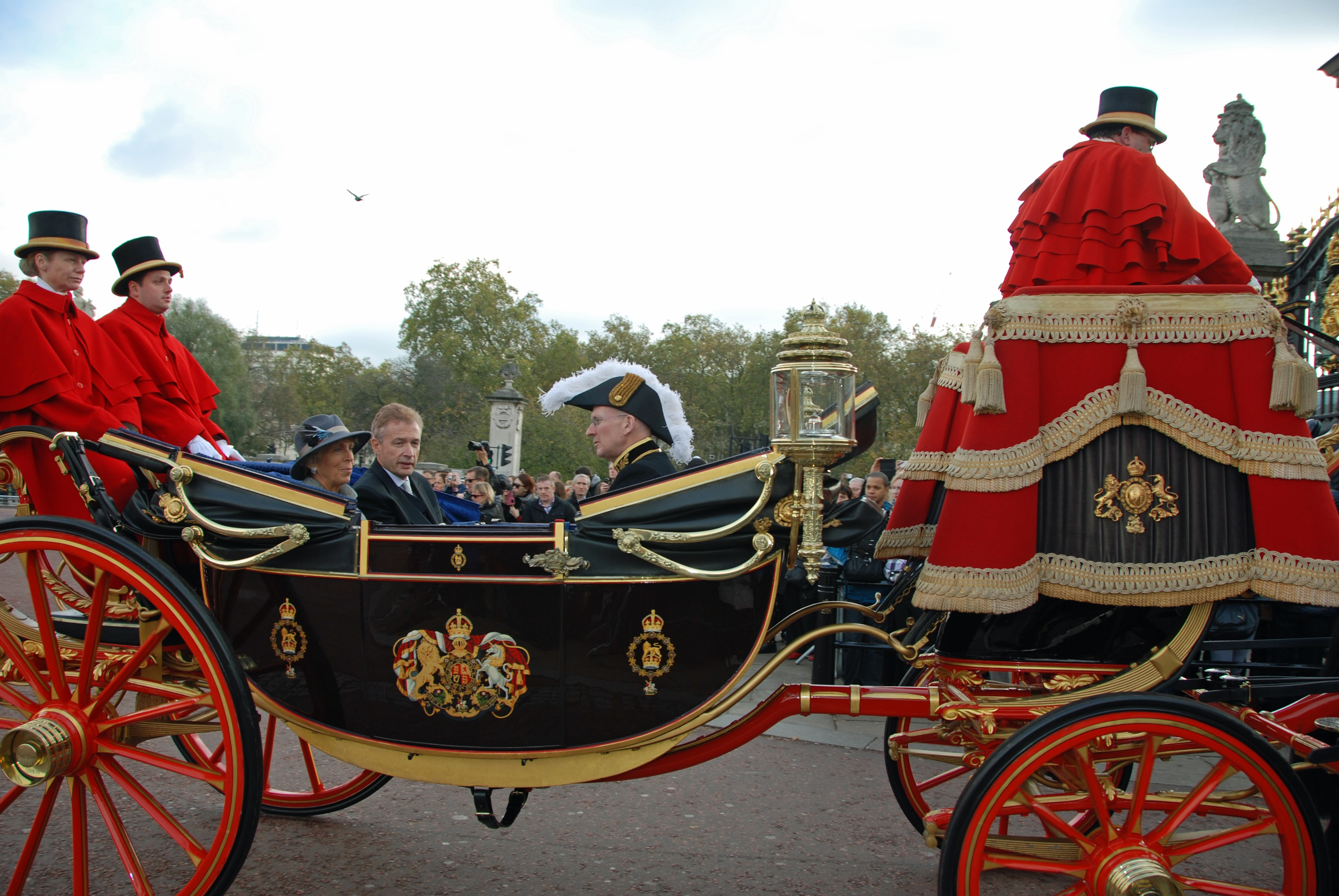
Presentation of credentials: the Marshal of the Diplomatic Corps, wearing a feathered cocked hat as part of his diplomatic uniform, accompanies a newly appointed ambassador and his wife for the journey by carriage to Buckingham Palace.

His Majesty's Marshal of the Diplomatic Corps is a senior member of the Royal Household of the Sovereign of the United Kingdom.

Their responsibilities include being the Monarch's link with the diplomatic community in London, arranging the Sovereign's annual diplomatic corps reception, organising the regular presentation of credentials ceremonies for ambassadors and high commissioners, as well as supervising the attendance of diplomats at state events.

Marshals generally hold office for ten-year terms. They are assisted by the Vice-Marshal of the Diplomatic Corps, the First Assistant Marshal, and other assistant marshals.

== History ==
Traditionally, marshals have been retired senior military officers, however, in recent years, they have been chosen from the Diplomatic Service instead.

The office was created in 1920 to replace the Master of the Ceremonies, an office dating from c.1620. Before 1920, the Vice-Marshal was known as the Marshal of the Ceremonies.

== Traditions ==
The Marshal of the Diplomatic Corps wears a two-sided 17th-century badge of office, a medal hung from a gold chain, previously worn by the Master of Ceremonies. During peacetime, the medal is worn showing an olive branch, with the motto Beati Pacifici (the personal motto of James VI and I). In times of war, the medal is reversed to show the image of a brandished sword, with the motto Dieu et mon droit.

The Marshal of the Diplomatic Corps is, along with the King's Equerry, one of two individuals expected to follow the tradition of walking backwards when leaving the presence of the monarch, as it has otherwise been dropped for health and safety reasons.

The tradition is expected to be followed when leaving a room, after being summoned to see the King personally, or after introducing others, such as senior foreign diplomats, for audiences with the King.

== List of Marshals of the Diplomatic Corps ==
- 1920–1934: Major-General Sir John Hanbury-Williams
- 1934–1945: Lieutenant-General Sir Sidney Clive
- 1945–1950: Sir John Monck
- 1950–1961: Major-General Sir Guy Salisbury-Jones
- 1962–1971: Rear-Admiral David Cairns, 5th Earl Cairns
- 1972–1981: Major-General Lord Michael Fitzalan-Howard
- 1982–1991: Lieutenant-General Sir John Richards, Royal Marines
- 1992–2001: Vice-Admiral Sir James Weatherall
- 2001–2008: Sir Anthony Figgis
- 2008–2014: Charles Gray
- 2014–present: Alistair Harrison

== List of Vice-Marshals of the Diplomatic Corps ==
- 1936–1945: Sir John Monck
- 1946–1957: Sir Marcus Cheke
- 1957–1965: Captain Dugald Malcolm
- 1965–1972: Sir Lees Mayall
- 1972–1975: Sir John Curle
- 1975–1982: Sir Roger Du Boulay
- 1982–1986: Sir Eustace Gibbs
- 1986–1991: Sir Roger Hervey
- 1991–1996: Sir Anthony Figgis
- 1996–1999: Philip Astley
- 1999–2001: Kathryn Colvin
- 2001–2006: Charles de Chassiron
- 2006–2009: Sarah Gillett
- 2009–2012: Simon Martin
- 2012–2014: Anna Clunes
- 2015: Catherine Nettleton
- 2015–2017: Julian Evans
- 2017–2020: Neil Holland
- 2020–2025: Victoria Busby
- 2025–present: Scott Furssedonn-Wood
