= David Abel =

David Abel may refer to:

- David Abel (general) (1935–2019), Myanmar Army general and cabinet minister
- David Abel (cinematographer) (1883–1973), Dutch-born cinematographer in Hollywood

== See also ==
- David Abell (disambiguation)
