= George Beresford-Stooke =

Sir George Beresford-Stooke
- Beresford-Stooke in 1948
- Born: George Beresford Stooke; 3 January 1897; Priors Marston, Warwickshire, England
- Died: 7 April 1983 (aged 86); Somerset, England
- Occupation: Colonial civil servant
- Known for: Governor of Sierra Leone

Sir George Beresford-Stooke KCMG (3 January 1897 – 7 April 1983) was Chief Secretary to Northern Rhodesia, and later appointed Governor of Sierra Leone from September, 1947 until December 1952. He was known as "Toby",

== Beginning ==
Beresford-Stooke was born on 3 January 1897 in Priors Marston, Warwickshire.

== Naval Career ==
On 15 January 1914 (just after his 17th birthday) he enrolled in the Royal Navy, and served throughout the First World War and retired with the rank of Paymaster Lieutenant.

== Colonial Service Career ==
After the end of the First World War, he joined His Majesty's Overseas Civil Service (HMOCS) :-

1920-1925 Cadet Sarawak,

1925-1933 District Officer Kenya,

1933-1936 Assistant Treasurer Mauritius,

1936-1938 Deputy Treasurer Kenya,

1838-1942 Chief Secretary of Zanzibar,

1942-1945 Chief Secretary of Northern Rhodesia,

1945-1946 Chief Secretary of Nigeria,

1947-1953 Governor and C-in-C Sierra Leone,

1953-1955 Second Crown Agent for the Colonies, based in London.

He was awarded the 2nd Class Order of Brilliant Star of Zanzibar, He was created CMG in 1943 and knighted as KCMG in 1948.

In 1959 he investigated the detention camps in Kenya.

== Governor of Sierra Leone (September 1947 – December 1952) ==
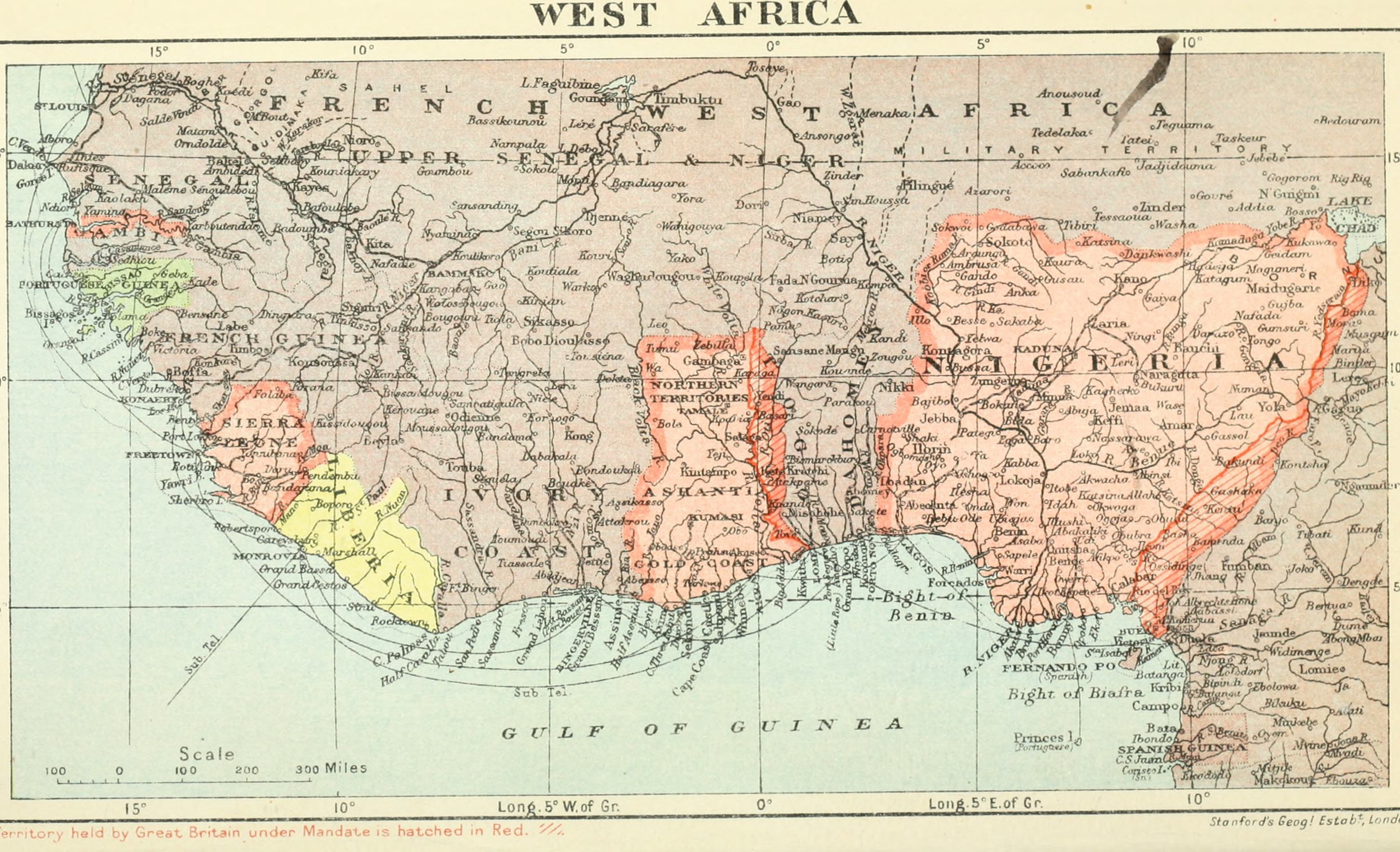
Map of West Africa, 1922; British territories in pink.

While Governor of Sierra Leone, he was also Chief Scout of that country. His time as governor corresponded with a troubling rise of the Crocodile Society in rural parts of the country.

In 1951, Sir George revised the Constitution of Sierra Leone to expand the franchise to women in areas of the "interior" where, up until that point, only men were allowed the right-to-vote on local matters. Beresford-Stooke ordered government resources to go towards building health clinics and repairing roads on Tasso, Kagbeli, and Tumbu Islands which had long been overlooked by the government. Each island had a small handful of facilities run by the British government, however those facilities were all racially segregated into "European" and "African" sections. Beresford-Stooke ordered all of those facilities to be desegregated, and all new facilities to be built without racial segregation in mind with respects to new structures. In the city of Bo, local indigenous leaders requested more funds for school building and road repairs, Beresford-Stooke succeeded in getting those funds allocated and having the repairs completed before leaving office. Beresford-Stooke also requested and received help in increasingly "rural literacy" programs in the colony's interior. He ordered that signs which had hitherto only been painted in English, also be painted in the Sherbro, Mende and Temne languages so that locals who did not speak English were able to read them. Sir Milton Margai later said that if more colonial administrators "had been like Beresford-Stooke, Hodson, Wilkinson and Ransford Slater, colonialism would have had a better reputation. However, most simply were not." He retired from HMOCS in 1952, aged 55 (the normal retirement age for that Service at that time).

== Family ==
He married Creenagh Lydia L. Richards, and in 1944 they adopted Peter (d. 1 July 2024), and later, Cara, both from South Africa.

== Scouting ==
During his second posting to Kenya, Sir George became friends with Lord Baden-Powell who had retired there; also Sir George's wife Creenagh had been involved in Guiding. When they moved to Northern Rhodesia, Baden-Powell's son-in-law was also there with HMOCS in Lusaka, the Capital.

== Retirement from HNOCS ==
Retiring to East Molesey, Surrey, near Hampton Court Palace, the home of Lady Baden-Powell, Sir George became Second Crown Agent for the Colonies. He served as Treasurer to the International African Institute, 1955–1965, and as Vice-Chairman, 1957–1974.

In 1954, after six months as Assistant, Sir George, having been a Scout for many years, was appointed Overseas Commissioner for the Boy Scout Association

Also in 1954, Sir George was appointed a Knight of the Order of St. John of Jerusalem. His portrait is in the National Portrait Gallery

In 1959, Sir George was part of a team tasked by UK to investigate the detention camps in Kenya.

Sir George was a Gentleman Usher of the Blue Rod of the Order of St. Michael and St. George, 1959–1972.

Sir George and Creenagh later moved to Hillfarance, west of Taunton, Somerset, close to the retirement home of the daughter of Lord & Lady Baden-Powell. Sir George died there on 7 April 1983. His wife Creenagh (born 14 May 1907) also died there, in November 1998.

== See also ==
- Index of Sierra Leone–related articles
- Hannah Benka-Coker

Court offices
Preceded by Sir Alan Hotham	Gentleman Usher of the Blue Rod; 1959–1972	Succeeded by Sir Anthony Abell
