= Roy Abell =

English cricketer (1931–2020)

Personal information
- Full name: Roy Beverley Abell
- Born: 21 January 1931; Small Heath, Birmingham
- Died: 30 June 2020; Sutton Coldfield, Birmingham
- Batting: Right handed
- Bowling: Leg break

Career statistics
Competition	First-class
Matches	1
Runs scored	–
Batting average	–
100s/50s	–
Top score	–
Balls bowled	246
Wickets	4
Bowling average	28
5 wickets in innings	0
10 wickets in match	0
Best bowling	3/64
Catches/stumpings	1/–
- Source: CricketArchive, 3 July 2020

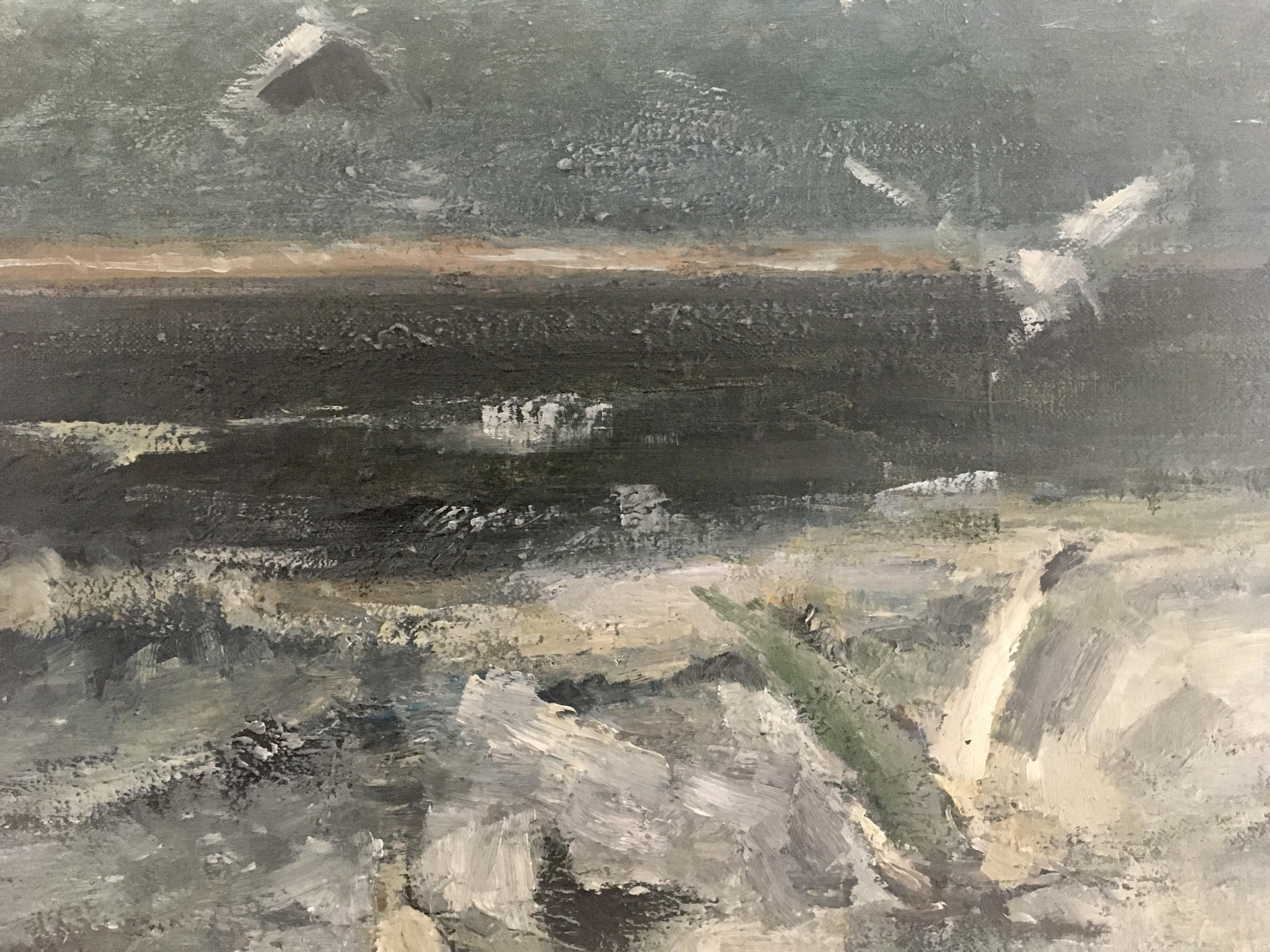
Seagulls and Sea, Oil on Canvas

Roy Beverley Abell (21 January 1931 – 30 June 2020) was an English Midlands-based artist. He was born in Small Heath, Birmingham and had a distinguished career as a painter and as an art teacher. He studied at the Birmingham College of Art and at the Royal College of Art in London, returning to Birmingham to teach at his former college from 1957 to 1982. He was made head of the painting school in 1974 and served as a member of the West Midlands Arts - Fine Arts Panel. In 1957 he was included as one of the 'Young Artists of Promise' in Jack Beddington's book.

Abell's paintings were a response to the visual world around him, painting using both oils and watercolour. His subjects were vast and wide-ranging, however his principal subjects were figurative and landscape, most particularly the wild landscapes of Spain, England, Scotland, Wales and especially the rugged coast of Pembrokeshire.

Abell exhibited in many solo and joint exhibitions across the country and his work is represented in public collections all over the UK: Birmingham Museum and Art Gallery, Amgueddfa Cymru – Museum Wales and Arts Council of Great Britain. Abell received a number of commissions during his career, most notably one of the six Alexander Howden Jubilee Awards - Great British Achievements in 1977.

Abell was also a cricketer, a right-handed batsman and leg-break bowler. Abell played for Warwickshire Second XI from 1960 to 1968, and played one first-class match for Warwickshire in 1967. He took four wickets against Cambridge University on debut at the advanced age of 36.

He was the first bowler to take 1,000 wickets in the Birmingham League.
