= Peter Abell =

British social scientist

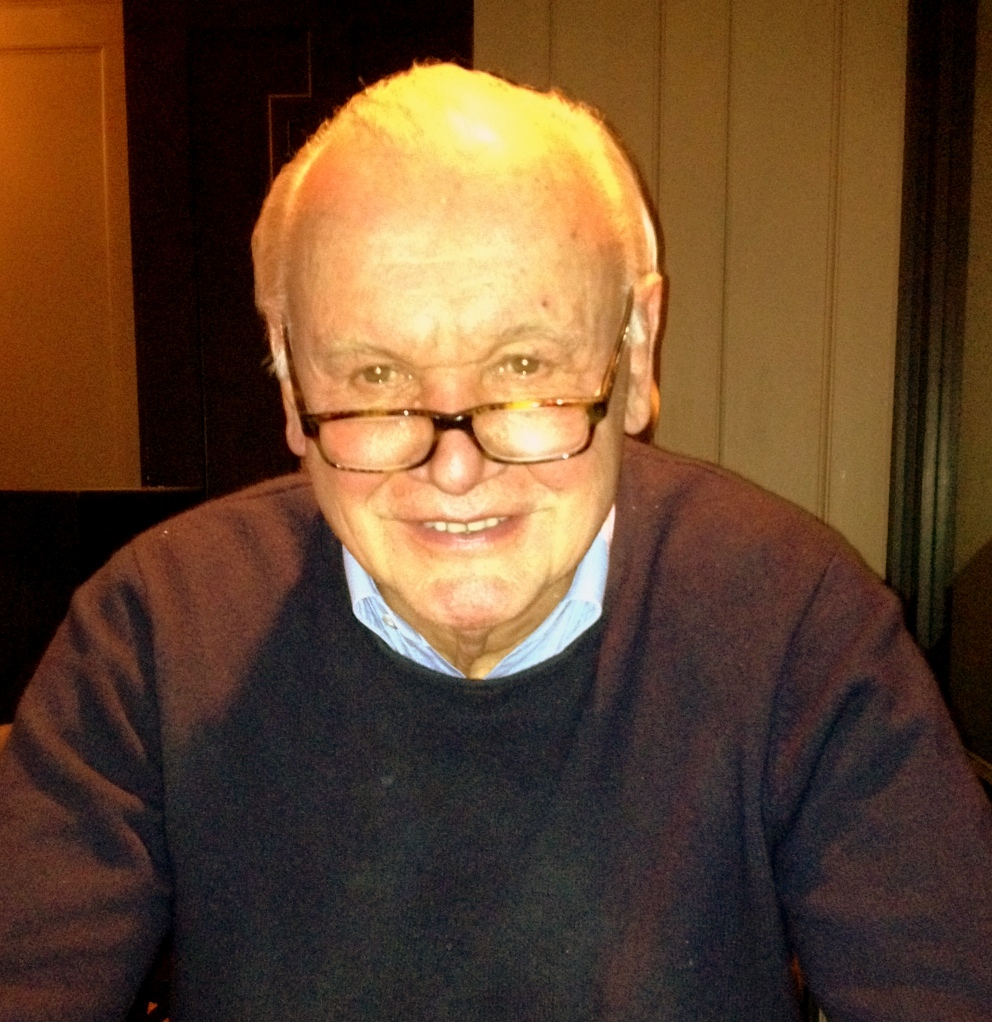
- Professor Peter Abell
- Born: 1939 (age 86–87); London, United Kingdom
- Education: University of Leeds
- Occupations: Professor in the Management and Economic Strategy group within the department of Management at London School of Economics
- Scientific career
- Fields: Social scientist
- Workplaces: London School of Economics; Copenhagen Business School; Nuffield College, Oxford; University of Essex; Imperial College of Science and Technology; University of Surrey; University of Birmingham

Peter Abell (born 1939) is a British social scientist, currently professor emeritus at the London School of Economics where he has founded and directed the "Interdisciplinary Institute of Management". He has been teaching for many years at LSE's Department of Management, managerial economics and strategy group.

== Academic career ==
Abell earned a BSc in physical chemistry from the University of Leeds in 1960, where he was a Brotherton Scholar. He completed a PhD in Ligand field theory in 1964 and also began (but did not complete) an MA in philosophy of science due to his academic appointment at the University of Essex.

His early academic career began at Essex, where he rose from research assistant to senior lecturer between 1965 and 1971. He went on to hold professorships and leadership roles at Imperial College London, the University of Birmingham, and the University of Surrey, where he served as Dean of the Faculty of Human Studies. In 1990, he became the founding director of the Interdisciplinary Institute of Management at LSE, where he served until 2003. He continues his affiliation with LSE as a part-time emeritus professor.

Abell has also held visiting appointments at several international institutions, including the University of California (Santa Barbara and Berkeley), the Copenhagen Business School, and the University of Chicago. He is a founding fellow of the European Sociological Association.

== Research and contributions ==
=== Bayesian narratives ===
Abell developed the concept of Bayesian narratives, a methodological framework that applies Bayesian inference to narrative explanations of social actions. This approach allows researchers to trace causality through sequences of events, blending case-based reasoning with probabilistic logic. His 2009 paper “A Case for Cases” and later work explore how such narratives can supplement traditional variable-based sociological analysis.

=== Structural balance and signed networks ===
Abell has made significant contributions to structural balance theory, particularly in signed social networks—networks with both positive and negative ties. His research, including the 2009 paper co-authored with Mark Ludwig, uses dynamic models and simulations to explore how balanced and unbalanced structures evolve, with implications for group formation and conflict dynamics.

=== Sociological measurement and methodology ===
In early foundational work, Abell addressed how measurement systems can be formalized in sociology. His late 1960s papers introduced ordinal graph-based approaches to understanding social structure and linked these methods to broader theoretical frameworks.

=== Other notable research ===
Abell has contributed to the study of cooperatives, particularly in developing countries, with a focus on organizational structure and participatory governance. He was involved in the Industrial Democracy in Europe (IDE) project, a major comparative study on employee participation across European workplaces. His research includes work on sequential rationality, challenging standard rational choice models. He has also worked on formalizing narrative explanations to integrate qualitative and quantitative methods in the social sciences.

== Consulting and policy work ==
Abell is known for his contribution to mathematical social science, both quantitative and qualitative. He is the author of several books on methodology and individual participation and co-operation and currently focuses on an approach he coined Bayesian narratives and on network analysis particularly the role of signed structures in group formation and identity change.

Abell has served as a consultant to various public and international bodies, including the British Board of Trade, the Roskill Commission on the Third London Airport, UNIDO, and the UK’s Economic and Social Research Council (ESRC). He contributed to studies on industrial relations, producer cooperatives, and PhD completion rates. He was also involved in European Union-funded management training programs in Cuba, Bulgaria, and Kazakhstan.

== Editorial and professional roles ==
Abell has served on the editorial boards of numerous journals, including Sociology, Economic and Industrial Democracy, Rationality and Society, and the Journal of Mathematical Sociology. He was a founding director of LSE's summer school in management and coordinated the London External Degree in Management for a decade. He is a fellow of the European Academy of Sociology and has supervised over 30 PhD students. He has also served as an external examiner for doctoral theses at Oxford, Imperial College London, and Manchester University.

== Political activism ==
During the 1960s, Abell was active in anti-nuclear demonstrations organized by the Committee of 100. He advocated for civil disobedience and nuclear disarmament, participating in mass protests in Trafalgar Square and elsewhere in London. and in his youth advocated for civil disobedience and nuclear disarmament.

== Selected publications ==
=== Books ===
- Abell, Peter (1971). Model building in sociology (basic ideas in the human sciences). London: Weidenfeld and Nicolson. OCLC 610200189.
- Abell, Peter, ed. (1975). Organizations as bargaining and influence systems. OCLC 464079399.
- Abell, Peter (1987). The syntax of social life: the theory and method of comparative narratives. Oxford Oxfordshire New York: Clarendon Press. ISBN 9780198272717.
- Abell, Peter (1988). Establishing support systems for industrial co-operatives: case studies from the Third World. Aldershot, Hants, England Brookfield, Vt., U.S.A: Avebury Gower Pub. Co. ISBN 9780566054754.
- Abell, Peter (2006). Organisation theory: an interdisciplinary approach. University of London Press. OCLC 903146201.
- Abell, Peter; Engel, Ofer (2023). Ethnographic Causality. University of Groningen Press. ISBN 978-9403429472.

=== Book chapters ===
- Abell, Peter (2011), "Singular Mechanisms and Bayesian Narratives", in Demeulenaere, Pierre (ed.), Analytical sociology and social mechanisms, Leiden: Cambridge University Press, pp. 121–135, ISBN 9781139082617.

=== Journal articles ===
- Abell, Peter (1993). "Some aspects of narrative method". Journal of Mathematical Sociology. 18 (2–3). Taylor and Francis: 93–134. doi:10.1080/0022250X.1993.9990119.
- Abell, Peter (January 2003). "On the prospects of a unified social science". Socio-Economic Review. 1 (1). Oxford Journals: 1–26. doi:10.1093/soceco/1.1.1.
- Abell, Peter (2004). "Narrative explanation: an alternative to variable-centered explanation?". Annual Review of Sociology. 30. Annual Reviews: 287–310. doi:10.1146/annurev.soc.29.010202.100113. JSTOR 29737695.
- Abell, Peter (2007). "Narratives, Bayesian narratives and narrative actions". Sociologica. 1 (3). Società editrice il Mulino. doi:10.2383/25959. S2CID 143114149.
- Abell, Peter (November 2007). "Review: Are reasons explanations?: Why? What Happens When People Give Reasons... and Why by Charles Tilly". Contemporary Sociology. 36 (6). Sage: 532–534. doi:10.1177/009430610703600608. JSTOR 20443961. S2CID 143899770.
- Abell, Peter (August 2009). "A case for cases: comparative narratives in sociological explanation". Sociological Methods & Research. 38 (1). Sage: 38–70. doi:10.1177/0049124109339372. S2CID 119501003.
