= David Abell =

David Abell may refer to:

- Dave Abell, American member of the band Iced Earth
- David Abell (businessman) (born 1942), British businessman
- David Abell (composer) (died c. 1576), Danish-German composer and organist
- David Charles Abell (born 1958), British American orchestral conductor
- David H. Abell (c. 1807–1872), New York politician

== See also ==
- David Abel (disambiguation)
