= Sidney Webb (cricketer) =

English cricketer

Sidney Webb (1 February 1875 – 4 April 1923) was an English cricketer active from 1897 to 1905 who played for Lancashire, Middlesex, and Griqualand West. He was born in Kensington and died in Ilford. He appeared in 83 first-class matches as a righthanded batsman who bowled right arm medium pace. He scored 554 runs with a highest score of 38* and held 58 catches. He took 302 wickets with a best analysis of eight for 36.
