= John Abell (cricketer) =

English cricketer

Personal information
- Full name: John Norman Abell
- Born: 18 September 1931; Chelsfield, Kent, England
- Died: 24 May 2004 (aged 72); Marlborough, Wiltshire, England
- Batting: Right-handed
- Role: Wicket-keeper
- Relatives: George Abell (father); Timothy Abell (brother); Ted Sale (great-uncle)

Domestic team information
- Years: Team
- 1952–1953: Oxford University

Career statistics
Competition	First-class
Matches	3
Runs scored	56
Batting average	11.20
100s/50s	–/–
Top score	25
Balls bowled	–
Wickets	–
Bowling average	–
5 wickets in innings	–
10 wickets in match	–
Best bowling	–
Catches/stumpings	2/6
- Source: Cricinfo, 27 April 2014

John Norman Abell (18 September 1931 – 25 May 2004) was an English cricketer active in the 1950s. Born at Chelsfield, Kent, Abell was the son of the cricketer George Abell. He attended Marlborough College, before undertaking studies at Worcester College, Oxford. While at Oxford he played three first-class cricket matches for Oxford University, playing twice in 1952 against the Free Foresters and Sussex, and once in 1953 against Worcestershire. A right-handed batsman and wicket-keeper, Abell scored 56 runs in his three matches, top-scoring 25, while behind the stumps he took two catches and made six stumpings. He notably stumped both Richardson brothers (Dick and Peter) against Worcestershire. Unlike his father, Abell did not manage to win a cricketing blue.

He died at Marlborough, Wiltshire on 25 May 2004. His brother Timothy Abell and great-uncle Ted Sale both played first-class cricket.
