= John Richards (Royal Marines officer) =

Lieutenant-General Sir John Richards KCB KCVO
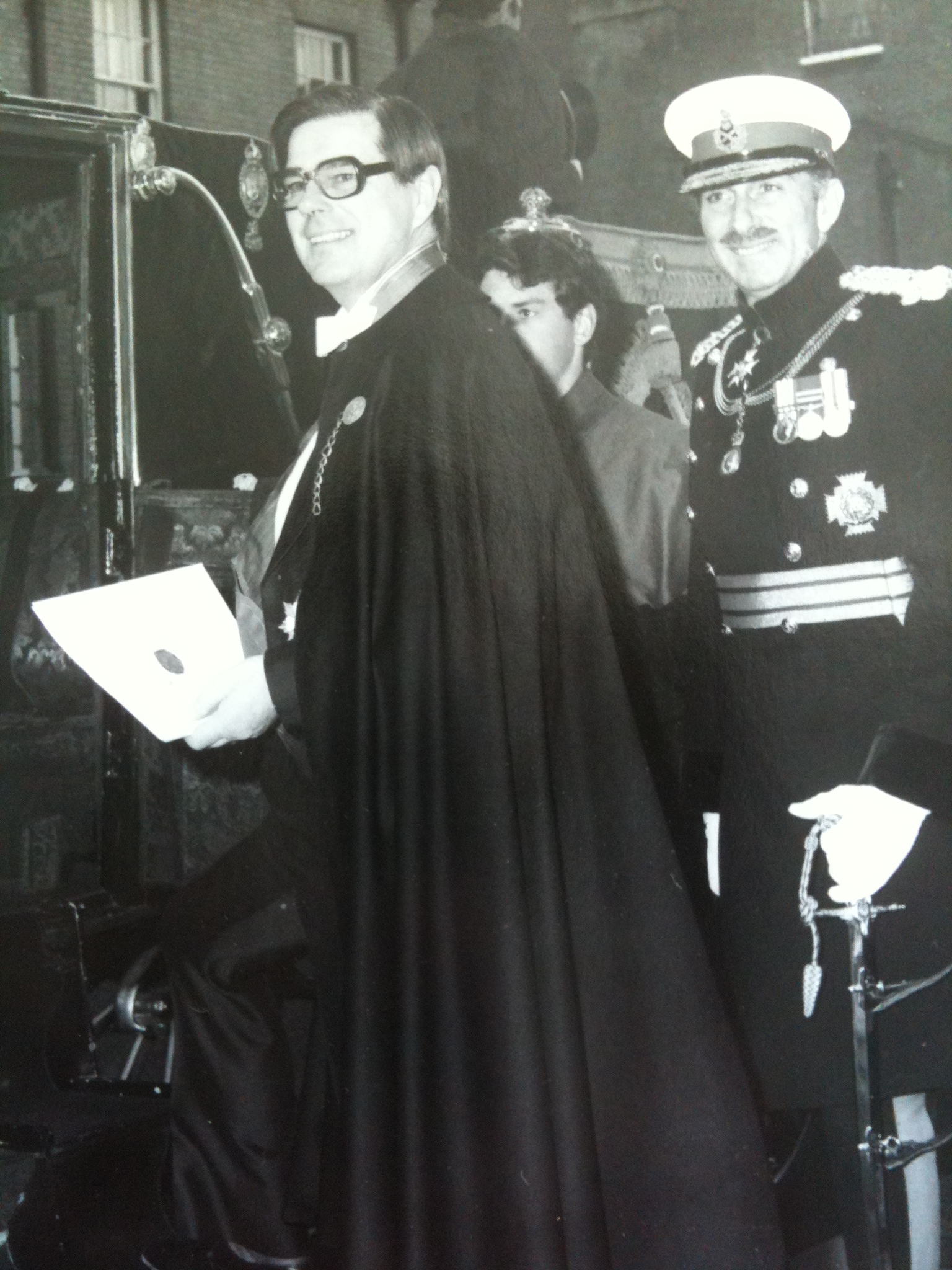
- Richards (right) as Marshal of the Diplomatic Corps with Ambassador Leif Leifland in 1982.
- Born: 21 February 1927
- Died: 5 October 2004 (aged 77); Aix-en-Provence, France
- Military career
- Allegiance: United Kingdom
- Branch: Royal Marines
- Service years: 1945–1981
- Rank: Lieutenant-General
- Commands: Commandant General Royal Marines (1977–81); 3 Commando Brigade (1976–76); 42 Commando (1970–72); 45 Commando (1968–69)
- Conflicts: Malayan Emergency; Aden Emergency
- Awards: Knight Commander of the Order of the Bath; Knight Commander of the Royal Victorian Order

Lieutenant-General Sir John Charles Chisholm Richards, KCB, KCVO (21 February 1927 – 5 October 2004) was a Royal Marines officer who served as Marshal of the Diplomatic Corps in the Royal Household from 1982 to 1991.

== Military career ==
Educated at Worksop College, Richards joined the Royal Marines in 1945. He was appointed commanding officer of 45 Commando in 1968, commander of 42 Commando in 1972, and commander of 3 Commando Brigade in 1975 before becoming Commandant General Royal Marines in 1977 and retiring in 1981.

In retirement Richards became Her Majesty's Marshal of the Diplomatic Corps in the Royal Household from 1982 to 1991. As such, he accompanied Pengiran Mustapha bin Pengiran Metassan (Brunei high commissioner to the United Kingdom) when he delivered his letters of credence to Queen Elizabeth II on 20 November 1990 at Buckingham Palace. He also attended a banquet in London in February 1992 to commemorate Brunei's eighth national day. Richards died at Aix-en-Provence on 5 October 2004.

== Honours ==
Richards was appointed a Knight Commander of the Order of the Bath (KCB) in the 1980 Birthday Honours, and a Knight Commander of the Royal Victorian Order (KCVO) in the 1991 New Year Honours.

== Family ==
In 1953 Richards married Audrey Hidson; they had two sons and one daughter.

Military offices
Preceded by Sir Peter Whiteley	Commandant General Royal Marines; 1977–1981	Succeeded by Sir Steuart Pringle
