= Timothy Abell =

English cricketer

Personal information
- Full name: Timothy George Abell
- Born: 29 April 1930; Lahore, Punjab, British India
- Died: 9 March 2009 (aged 78); Basingstoke, Hampshire
- Batting: Right-handed
- Bowling: Right-arm off break
- Relatives: George Abell (father); John Abell (brother); Ted Sale (great-uncle)

Career statistics
Competition	First-class
Matches	1
Runs scored	4
Batting average	4.00
100s/50s	–/–
Top score	4*
Balls bowled	18
Wickets	–
Bowling average	–
5 wickets in innings	–
10 wickets in match	–
Best bowling	–
Catches/stumpings	–/–
- Source: Cricinfo, 27 April 2014

Timothy George Abell (29 April 1930 – 9 March 2009) was an English cricketer and field hockey player.

The son of the cricketer George Abell, Abell was born at Lahore while his father worked as a civil servant in the British Raj. He was educated in England at Marlborough College, before undertaking studies at the University of Oxford. He played hockey for Oxford, winning a blue. He later played hockey for Middlesex and England. He made one appearance in first-class cricket for the Free Foresters in 1954 against Cambridge University at Fenner's.

His brother John Abell and great-uncle Ted Sale both played first-class cricket.
