= Ben Abell =

American professor of meteorology (1932–2019)

- Born: March 1, 1932
- Died: February 11, 2019 (aged 86)
- Education: Saint Louis University Bachelor of Science (1960); Master of Science (1965) (Meteorology and Statistics)
- Occupation(s): Professor; Meteorologist
- Years active: 1962–2011; 1972–2007
- Employer: Saint Louis University (SLU)
- Organization: KWMU-FM
- Known for: Volunteer forecasting
- Title: Professor of Meteorology
- Awards: St. Louis Radio Hall of Fame; Best Meteorologist (in St Louis)

Benjamin F. Abell (March 1, 1932 – February 11, 2019) was an American meteorologist. He was professor of meteorology in the Department of Earth and Atmospheric Sciences at Saint Louis University (SLU), where he was a member of the faculty from 1962 to 2011. He also volunteered as the sole meteorologist for St. Louis, Missouri, public radio station KWMU-FM since the station began broadcasting in 1972 through early 2007. To recognize and preserve his contributions as an outstanding member of the St. Louis radio community, Abell was a 2005–2006 inductee to the St. Louis Radio Hall of Fame.

== Early and personal life ==
Born March 1, 1932, Ben Abell grew up in the Washington, D.C., area, and as a child his fascination with weather began when that area suffered severe flooding. He also gained firsthand experience of the consequences of weather working on his uncle's tobacco farm in the summers. Abell has four children, Olga, Kathleen, Ben, and Brian. Olga also studied meteorology at SLU.

Abell was an Army intelligence officer in the Korean War.

== Professional work ==
Abell received his Bachelor of Science (B.S.) degree from Saint Louis University in 1960, continuing with his Master of Science (M.S.) degree in meteorology and statistics in 1965. Originally intending to work for the National Weather Service (NWS), or the name of the agency at the time, the Weather Bureau, after graduation, Abell accepted an offer for a position on staff at Parks College in 1962. He transferred to Saint Louis University upon the merger of Parks College therein, where he remained until his retirement in 2011. His primary research areas were severe local storms, climate change, tropical cyclones, and weather forecasting, while his primary teaching areas were climate and humankind in history, and mesoscale analysis and severe storms. As the undergraduate meteorology program director, he taught some introductory courses in the department as well as serving as the primary contact for prospective and new meteorology students. He was also a forensic meteorologist.

== Volunteer forecasting ==
Abell began his stint as volunteer meteorologist for KWMU when the station began airing in 1972. Before accepting the position at KWMU, students from SLU were making the forecasts and broadcasts for the station, but would make the morning's forecasts the night before to avoid any early-morning engagements. After repeated requests from the fledgling broadcaster, and to better ensure correct and appropriate morning forecasts, Abell acquiesced and accepted the unpaid position as the station's meteorologist.

Abell was warmly received for his "pragmatic" stance on his forecasting, evidenced by his signature phrase: "I can't rule it out"; forthright with his listeners, Abell lays out the evidences he has for his forecast and the rationales for his conclusions. In addition to computer-generated weather models, Abell draws upon "years and years and years of experience", and is more inclined to rely on his instinct as opposed to the computer when the two forecasts diverge. The alternative weekly the Riverfront Times (RFT) in 2000 awarded Abell as "Best Meteorologist". St. Louis city Mayor Clarence Harmon proclaimed February 2, 2000, as Ben Abell Day.

Upon retiring from his 35-year volunteer position on April 27, 2007, Abell had provided the St. Louis area with more than 120,000 forecasts. His weather reports were also heard on KFUO-FM, KMOX, KHTR, and KCFM.

== Death ==
Abell died February 11, 2019, in a nursing home, aged 86, afflicted with a number of ailments. As a veteran, he was buried at the Jefferson Barracks National Cemetery.
