= George Abell (civil servant) =

English cricketer and civil servant (1904–1989)

- Abell in 1964.

Cricket information
- Batting: Right-handed
- Role: Wicket-keeper

Career statistics
Competition	First-class
Matches	75
Runs scored	2,674
Batting average	24.75
100s/50s	4/8
Top score	210
Balls bowled	3
Wickets	0
Bowling average	–
5 wickets in innings	–
10 wickets in match	–
Best bowling	–
Catches/stumpings	97/35
- Source: CricketArchive, 15 April 2023

Sir George Edmond Brackenbury Abell KCIE OBE (22 June 1904 – 11 January 1989) was an English civil servant and cricketer. Although his civil service career was the more significant, he was an excellent all-round sportsman, who won Blues for Oxford at cricket, rugby union and hockey as well as playing county cricket for Worcestershire. He was born in Worcester, and died at the age of 84 in Ramsbury, Wiltshire.

== Civil service career ==
Abell was educated at Marlborough College and Corpus Christi College, Oxford. In 1928 he entered the Indian Civil Service and was posted to the Punjab. He was Private Secretary to the Governor of the Punjab 1941–43 and then private secretary to the last two viceroys of India, Lord Wavell and Lord Mountbatten. He was appointed OBE in 1943, and CIE in the 1946 New Year Honours. In 1947, shortly before Indian independence, he was knighted KCIE. He returned to the United Kingdom and was a director of the Bank of England 1952–64 and First Civil Service Commissioner 1964–67.

== Cricketing career ==
Abell's first-class debut came for Worcestershire against Essex at Worcester in August 1923; He had a quiet match, claiming no dismissals and scoring 1 and 6 not out. Indeed, in three further appearances that season he appeared on the scorecard only once as a fielder: when he caught Gloucestershire captain Philip Williams off the bowling of Fred Root. Abell scored 50 in the second innings of this game, the only half-century he would make for nearly two years.

The 1924 season saw Abell play 12 first-class matches: seven for Oxford University and five for Worcestershire. His batting produced nothing of note (his highest score that season was just 23*) but he held 12 catches and made two stumpings. The following year, however, he passed 500 runs for the only time in his career, this total including 124 for Worcestershire against Sussex. He also claimed 17 dismissals. From 1926 until 1928 he performed poorly with the bat, 50 being his highest score in 31 innings, but he continued to pick up victims behind the stumps.

From 1928–29 to 1934–35 he played all his first-class cricket in India for a variety of sides, including Europeans, the Punjab Governor's XI – for whom he made 92 and 116 against Muslims in March 1929 – and even on one occasion for India itself, against Ceylon. However, the undoubted highlight of his career was the 210 he scored for Northern India against Army in the first Ranji Trophy in 1934–35, the first double century made in the competition. Northern India reached the final for the only time that season; Abell captained them against Bombay but Vajifdar's second-innings 8–40 for Bombay ensured a heavy defeat for Northern India.

Abell returned to play in England during the second half of the 1935 season, and he also had a few matches in 1939. (His civil service commitments precluded more frequent appearances.) Most of these games were for Worcestershire, for whom he acted as captain three times in 1939, but he also turned out for Marylebone Cricket Club (MCC) on a handful of occasions. His final first-class game of all was at Lahore, as captain of Northern India against Southern Punjab in the 1941–42 Ranji Trophy. He made one stumping, held two catches and scored 11 and 2 as Northern India ran out 74-run winners.

Two of Abell's sons, John and Timothy, had very brief first-class careers. His brother-in-law Claude Ashton had a much more substantial career with Essex and Cambridge, while his uncle Ted Sale turned out a few times for Europeans.

== Media ==
Abell was portrayed by British Actor Michael Byrne in the ITV television Miniseries Lord Mountbatten: The Last Viceroy in 1986, and by Ed Robinson in the Sony LIV Web Series Freedom at Midnight in 2024.

Government offices
Preceded by Sir George Mallaby	First Civil Service Commissioner; 1964–1967	Succeeded by John Hunt
