= Anthony Figgis =

Sir Anthony St John Howard Figgis, KCVO CMG (born October 1940) was Her Majesty's Marshal of the Diplomatic Corps in the Royal Household of the Sovereign of the United Kingdom from 2001 to 2008.

Unusually, he also held the post of Her Majesty's Vice-Marshal of the Diplomatic Corps, from 1991 to 1996, when he became Her Britannic Majesty's Ambassador to Austria.

== Early life ==
Of Irish origin, Figgis was born in 1940, and educated at Rugby School and King's College, Cambridge.

== Career ==
He joined Her Majesty's Diplomatic Service in 1962. Figgis' first overseas posting was as 3rd Secretary in Belgrade in 1963. In 1965 he was assigned to the Commonwealth Office in London. He was 2nd Secretary (Political Residency) in Bahrain from 1968 to 1970, when he returned to the Foreign and Commonwealth Office in London. Figgis' next posting was as 1st Secretary (Commercial) in Madrid, where he was stationed 1971 to 1974. He was in the CSCE delegation at Geneva 1974 to 1975 and again at the Foreign and Commonwealth Office in London 1975 to 1979.

He returned to Madrid in 1979, initially as Head of Chancery and then as Commercial Counsellor from 1980 to 1982. Figgis was assigned to Belgrade again in 1982, when he was made Counsellor, a post he held until 1985. From 1986 to 1988, Figgis was Head of the East European Department of the Foreign and Commonwealth Office. He was then Counsellor and Head of Chancery in Bonn from 1988 to 1989. He was subsequently Director of Research, and then of Research and Analysis, at the Foreign and Commonwealth Office from 1989 to 1991.

From 1991 to 1996, Figgis was Assistant Under-Secretary of State at the Foreign and Commonwealth Office and Her Majesty's Vice-Marshal of the Diplomatic Corps.

He is a patron of Children and Families Across Borders (CFAB), a charity dedicated to reuniting children who have been separated from their families.

== Awards and decorations ==
He became a Freeman of the City of London in 1996, was appointed CMG in 1993 and was knighted as a KCVO in 1996. In 2002, he was appointed Gentleman Usher of the Blue Rod, retiring in 2016.

Diplomatic posts
Preceded by Terence Courtney Wood	British Ambassador to Austria; 1996–2000	Succeeded by Antony Ford
Court offices
Preceded by Sir John Margetson	Gentleman Usher of the Blue Rod; 2002–2016	Succeeded by Dame DeAnne Julius
