= Ted Sale =

English cricketer (1871–1920)

Personal information
- Full name: Edward Little Sale
- Born: 17 June 1871; Attercliffe, Sheffield, Yorkshire, England
- Died: 2 September 1920 (aged 49); Aldington, Kent, England
- Relatives: George Abell (nephew)

Domestic team information
- Years: Team
- 1898–99 to 1903–04: Europeans

Career statistics
Competition	First-class
Matches	8
Runs scored	289
Batting average	19.26
100s/50s	0/2
Top score	93
Balls bowled	304
Wickets	4
Bowling average	41.75
5 wickets in innings	0
10 wickets in match	0
Best bowling	1/8
Catches/stumpings	6/–
- Source: Cricinfo, 10 March 2022

Edward Little Sale (17 June 1871 – 2 September 1920) was an English cricketer. While working in the Indian Civil Service he played eight matches of first-class cricket in India for the Europeans between 1898 and 1903.

== Life and career ==
Sale was born in Yorkshire and educated at Marlborough College, Bury St Edmunds School and Clare College, Cambridge. He worked as assistant collector and magistrate in Bombay from 1894 to 1902, and then as a forestry settlement officer. He married Constance Abell in Painswick, Gloucestershire, in 1908. Their nephew Sir George Abell was also a civil servant and first-class cricketer in India and England.

At the time of Sale's service in India, first-class cricket in India was restricted to the Bombay Presidency matches between Europeans and Parsees in Bombay and Poona. He was the Europeans' highest scorer in the match in August 1900, although he made only 24 and the Parsees won by 135 runs. A few weeks later he was the Europeans' top scorer again with 84, leading the fightback after a 217-run first-innings deficit to earn a close-fought draw. In the match in September 1901, Sale scored 93, the highest score on either side, when the Europeans defeated the Parsees by 192 runs.

In September 1920, shortly after purchasing an estate at Aldington in Kent, Sale was found shot dead in a nearby wood with a rifle lying beside him.
