= Abel (surname) =

Origin
- Meaning: English Variation : "breath" from the given name Abel, the second son of Adam and Eve, German Variation: “Noble one” in Old German
- Region of origin: Germany, England

Other names
- Variant forms: Abell, Abele, Aubeller, Abelle, Abeles, Abeler

Abel can be either a German or English surname. The German variant of the surname is a patronymic name, derived from the Old German personal name Abel, which means "noble one." The German variation does not appear to be derived from the biblical name Abel. The surname is associated with Swabia, in the southwest of Germany.

Notable people with the surname include:

== Arts ==
- Alan Abel (1924–2018), American prankster and writer
- Alfred Abel (1879–1937), German film actor, director, and producer
- Bernhard, Arnold, and Florian Abel, two sculptors and a painter in the 16th century
- Clamor Heinrich Abel (1634–1696), German baroque composer
  - Christian Ferdinand Abel (1682–1761), German baroque composer, son of former
    - Carl Friedrich Abel (1723–1787), German classical composer, son of former
- Clementine Abel (1826–1905), German writer
- David Abel (cinematographer) (1884–1973), American cinematographer
- Ervin Abel (1929–1984), Estonian actor
- Inga Abel (1946–2000), German actress
- Jack Abel (1927–1996), American comic book artist
- Jake Abel (born 1987), American actor
- Jessica Abel (born 1969), American comics writer
- John Abel (carpenter) (1578/9–1675), English master carpenter
- Josef Abel (1768–1818), Austrian painter and etcher
- Ludwig Abel (1834–1895), German violinist, composer, and conductor
- Mari Abel (born 1975), Estonian actress
- Morten Abel (born 1962), Norwegian singer
- Myriam Abel (born 1981), French singer
- Robert Abel (1937–2001), American visual effects artist
- Robert H. Abel (1941–2017), American author
- Rudolph E. Abel (1902–1974), American film and television producer
- Sam Abell (born 1945), American photographer
- Steve Abel (born 1970), New Zealand singer-songwriter and environmental activist
- Walter Abel (1898–1987), American actor
- Yves Abel (born 1963), Canadian conductor
- Zak Abel (born 1995), English singer/songwriter, musician, and table tennis player

== History ==
- Annie Heloise Abel (1873–1947), British historian
- Caspar Abel (1676–1763), German theologian, historian and poet
- Heinrich Friedrich Otto Abel (1824–1854), German historian
- Sigurd Abel (1837–1873), German historian

== Mathematics, science and technology ==
- Eddie Abel (1931–2021), British chemist
- Félix-Marie Abel (1878–1953), French archaeologist, geographer and professor
- Frederick Abel (1827–1902), chemist who made a special study of explosives
- John Jacob Abel (1857–1938), American pharmacologist
- Kathryn Abel (born 1961), British clinical psychologist
- Niels Henrik Abel (1802–1829), Norwegian mathematician
- Othenio Abel (1875–1945), Austrian paleontologist
- Ted Abel, American neuroscientist
- Theodore Fred Abel (1896–1988), American sociologist
- Tom Abel (cosmologist) (born 1970), German astrophysicist
- Wolfgang Abel (1905–1997), German anthropologist

== Medicine ==
- Clarke Abel (1780–1826), British surgeon and naturalist
- Friedrich Gottfried Abel (1714–1794), German physician and son of Caspar

== Politics ==
- Donald Abel (born 1952), Canadian politician
- Hazel Abel (1888–1966), American politician
- Helena Bonguela Abel (born 1957), Angolan teacher and politician
- I. W. Abel (1908–1987), American labor leader
- John Abel (Australian politician) (1939–2019), Australian politician
- Johnny Abel (1947–1995), Canadian politician
- Karl von Abel (1788–1859), Bavarian statesman
- Leighton Abel (1900–1975), American businessman and politician
- Søren Georg Abel (1772–1820), Norwegian priest and politician
- Valentin Abel (born 1991), German politician

== Religion ==
- Caspar Abel (1676–1763), German theologian, historian and poet
- Elijah Abel (1810–1884), American Latter Day Saint
- Shlomo Zalman Abel (1857–1866), Lithuanian rabbi
- Thomas Abel (martyr) (c. 1490–1540), English priest

== Sports ==
- Anicet Abel (born 1990), Malagasy footballer
- Bobby Abel (1857–1936), British cricketer
- Chris Abel (1912–1986), English footballer
- Florian Abel (born 1989), German footballer
- Fred Abel (1903–1980), American football player
- George Abel (1916–1996), Canadian ice hockey player
- Gerry Abel (1944–2021), American ice hockey player
- Graham Abel (born 1960), English footballer
- Hans-Joachim Abel (born 1952), German footballer
- Jacob Abel (racing driver) (born 2001), American racing driver
- Jennifer Abel (born 1991), Canadian diver
- Katrine Abel (born 1990), Danish footballer
- Mathias Abel (born 1981), German footballer
- Mick Abel (born 2001), American baseball player
- Sid Abel (1918–2000), Canadian hockey player and coach
- Sten Abel (1872–1942), Norwegian sailor
- Taffy Abel (1900–1964), American ice hockey player
- Thomas Abel (footballer) (born 1974), Danish footballer
- Tom Abel (cricketer) (1890–1937), cricketer
- Torsten Abel (born 1974), German triathlete
- William Abel (1887–1934), English cricketer

== Other ==
- Carl Abel (1837–1906), German philologist
- Elie Abel (1921–2004), Canadian-American journalist, author and academic
- Greg Abel (born 1962), Canadian businessman
- Iorwith Wilbur Abel (1908–1987), American labor leader
- Jacob Friedrich von Abel (1751–1829), German philosopher
- Richard Abel (lawyer), professor of law
- Rudolf Abel, an alias of Vilyam Genrikhovich Fisher (1903–1971), Soviet spy

== See also ==
- Aabel
- Abell (surname)
- Abels (surname)
- Able (surname)
