= Robert Abel =

Robert or Bobby Abel may refer to:

== Names ==
- Bobby Abel (1857–1936), English cricketer
- Robert Abel (animator) (1937–2001), American visual effects engineer
- Robert Abel (footballer) (1912–1986), English professional footballer
- Robert H. Abel (1941–2017), American short story writer

== Other ==
- Robert Abel and Associates, company owned by the above
