= Klamer Eberhard Karl Schmidt =

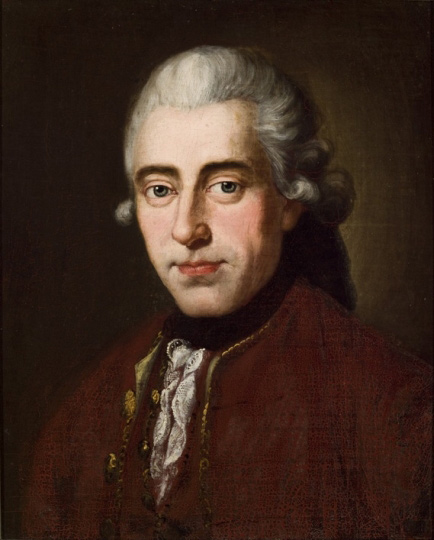
Klamer Eberhard Karl Schmidt Ernst Gottlob, 1774

Klamer Eberhard Karl Schmidt (29 December 1746 – 8 January 1824) was a jurist and a popular German poet-lyricist.

== Life ==
Klamer Eberhard Karl Schmidt was born in the Harz region between Hannover and Leipzig, in the little Prussian town of Halberstadt, which is also where he grew up and lived out most of his life, employed for some years as a " Domänenrat" (middle-grade government administrative official). His father, about whom sources are somewhat disparaging, was a writer-clerk with some form of legal training. His parents were adequately networked locally, however. While he was growing up his mother, strongly supported by the rector at the Halberstadt cathedral school, was keen that he should study Theology and make his career as a churchman.

Between 1764 and 1767 Schmidt studied Jurisprudence at Halle. During his time at Halle or shortly after returning to Halberstadt, he became a member of the Halberstadt Poets' Circle around the popular enlightenment poet Johann Wilhelm Ludwig Gleim.

Like his mentor Gleim, Schmidt became a prominent member of the Halberstadt Literary Society which existed between 1785 and 1810. The society was created through the coming together of around 40 Halberstadt citizens representing, primarily, the intellectual classes. They included government officials, ministers of religion, teachers, physicians, army officers and minor aristocrats. Its presence and activities in the town reflected and contributed to Halberstadt's status as a centre of progressive philosophy during the later enlightenment years, which coincided with the period of Schmidt's literary career.

On 1788 he teamed up with Gleim to publish a volume of poems by Caroline Louise von Klencke. In 1802, following her death, they had a further volume privately printed which was dedicated to the memory of von Klencke, whose life had been a difficult one. Among other compositions, this book included two of Schmidt's own poems.

In 1820 he published "Klopstock und seine Freunde", a book of Klopstock's correspondence in Halberstadt. Between 1826 and 1828 three volumes were published under the title "Leben und auserlesene Werke", containing a selection of Schmidt's own works.

Although his own poems were popular during his lifetime, they fell rapidly out of fashion after his death. One reason that he was not completely forgotten is the extent to which his verses appealed to composers on the look-out for song lyrics. His "Trennungslied" ("Song of Separation") survives in a 1787 setting by Mozart. There is also a Beethoven setting of his poem "Meine weise Mutter spricht".

== Personal ==
In 1781 Klamer Eberhard Karl Schmidt married Louise Magdalena Justina Abel (1754–1832). She came from a family noted for erudition and was a daughter of the distinguished Halberstadt physician, literary scholar and associate of Gleim, Friedrich Gottfried Abel (1714–1794) . Her grandfather had been the Theologian-Historian and Plattdeutsch poet, Caspar Abel (1676–1763). Through his marriage Schmidt also acquired the physician and Collector Johann Gotthelf Leberecht Abel as a brother-in-law.

The marriage was followed by the births of the couple's five recorded children.
