= Abuel =

Abuel is a surname. Notable people with the surname include:

- Janet Abuel (born 1971), Filipino lawyer, accountant, and public servant
- Louise Abuel (born 2003), Filipino actor and model
- Tommy Abuel (born 1942), Filipino actor

== See also ==
- Abel (surname)
