= Abels (surname) =

Abels is a surname. Notable people with the surname include:

- Erika Abels (1896–1975), Austrian painter and graphic artist
- Jacob Abels (1803–1866), Dutch painter
- Michael Abels (born 1962), American classical composer
- Paul Abels (1937–1992), American Methodist minister
- Roos Abels (born 1999), Dutch fashion model

== See also ==
- Abel (surname)
