= Jim Cutmore =

English cricketer

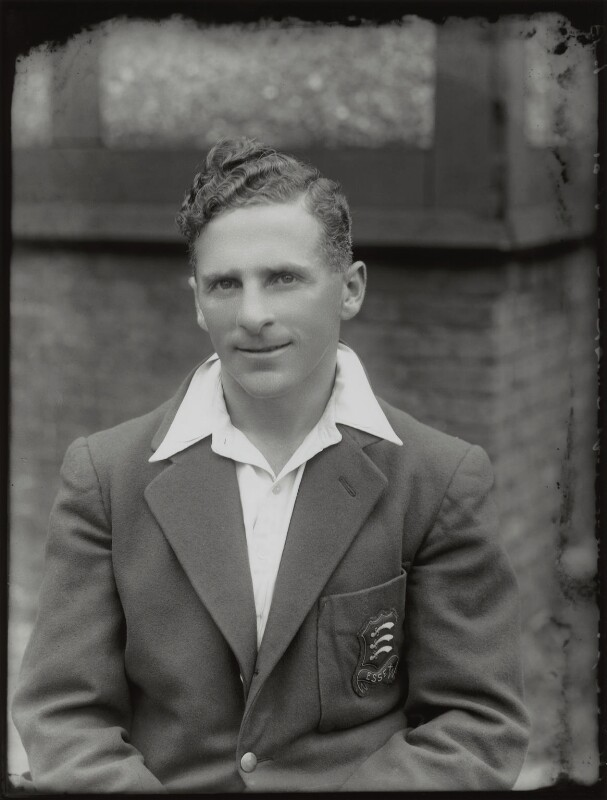
- Cutmore in 1931

Personal information
- Full name: James Albert Cutmore
- Born: 28 December 1898; Walthamstow, Essex, England
- Died: 30 November 1985 (aged 86); Brentwood, Essex, England
- Batting: Right-handed
- Bowling: Right-arm medium pace

Domestic team information
- Years: Team
- 1924–1936: Essex
- First-class debut: 5 July 1924 Essex v Surrey
- Last First-class: 17 June 1936 Essex v Yorkshire

Career statistics
Competition	FC
Matches	342
Runs scored	15,937
Batting average	28.61
100s/50s	15/88
Top score	238*
Balls bowled	961
Wickets	11
Bowling average	62.45
5 wickets in innings	0
10 wickets in match	0
Best bowling	2/31
Catches/stumpings	121/–
- Source: CricketArchive, 6 June 2012

James Albert Cutmore (28 December 1898 – 30 November 1985) was an English first-class cricketer who spent his entire career with Essex County Cricket Club. Cutmore was primarily a middle-order batsman who played right-handed, making a total of almost 16,000 runs in 342 first-class matches at an average of 28.61; however, he also bowled on occasion, taking 11 wickets at an average of 62.45.

Cutmore was born in Walthamstow, Essex (now in the London Borough of Waltham Forest). He made his Essex debut on 5 July 1924 in a home match against Surrey in the 1924 County Championship; coming in at number 7, he made 18 runs in the first innings and 29 in the second, as well as taking the second-innings wicket of William Abel with one of the four balls he bowled in the innings; Surrey won the match by 5 wickets. As his career continued, Cutmore rose up the Essex batting line-up, even opening the innings on occasion; in 1927, he opened the batting in an away match against Gloucestershire at Greenbank and went on to make his career best score of 238 not out before Essex declared on 578/6. By the end of his career, Cutmore had settled near the top of the middle-order. His final appearance came on 17 June 1936, away to Yorkshire; with Essex batting second, Cutmore came in at number 3 and made 21 runs before being trapped LBW by Bill Bowes; in the second innings, he opened the batting, but this time made only 13 runs before he was caught by Arthur Mitchell off the bowling of Hedley Verity.

Cutmore died in Brentwood, Essex, on 30 November 1985 at the age of 86.
