= Hohenberg-Krusemark =

- Municipality
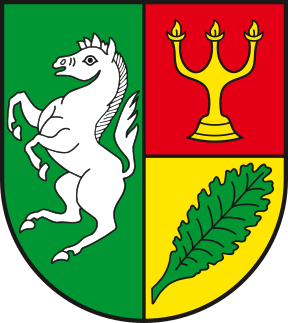
- Coat of arms

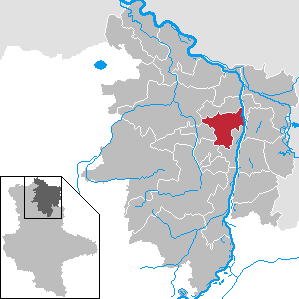
- Location of Hohenberg-Krusemark within Stendal district
- Interactive map of Hohenberg-Krusemark
- Location within Germany Location within Saxony-Anhalt
- Coordinates: 52°43′36″N 11°57′11″E
- Country: Germany
- State: Saxony-Anhalt
- District: Stendal
- Municipal assoc.: Arneburg-Goldbeck

Government
  - Mayor (2019–26): Dirk Kautz

Area
  - Total: 63.45 km^{2} (24.50 sq mi)
- Elevation: 31 m (102 ft)

Population (2025-12-31)
  - Total: 1,121
  - Density: 17.67/km^{2} (45.76/sq mi)
- Time zone: UTC+01:00 (CET)
  - Summer (DST): UTC+02:00 (CEST)
- Postal codes: 39596
- Dialling codes: 039394
- Vehicle registration: SDL
- Website: www.arneburg-goldbeck.de

Hohenberg-Krusemark (German pronunciation: [ˈhoːənbɛʁk ˈkʁuːzəmaʁk]) is a municipality in the district of Stendal, in Saxony-Anhalt, Germany. It is about 17 km (10 miles) North East of the town Stendal.

== Geography ==
The municipality consists of the following 10 divisions (Ortsteile):

- Altenzaun
- Gethlingen
- Groß Ellingen
- Hindenburg (incl. Klein Hindenburg)
- Hohenberg-Krusemark
- Klein Ellingen
- Osterholz
- Rosenhof
- Schwarzholz

== History ==
On 17 October 1928 the Hohenberg estate district was merged with the Krusemark estate district and the rural municipalities of Hohenberg and Krusemark to form a rural municipality of Hohenberg-Krusemark. The municipality of Hohenberg-Krusemark was reorganized on 25 July 1952 from the district of Osterburg to the district of Osterburg. After its dissolution it became part of the district of Stendal on 1 July 1994.

On 31 December 2008 the community of Hindenburg was incorporated, on 1 January 2009 the community of Altenzaun and on 1 September 2010 the community of Schwarzholz was incorporated.

Year	Population
1925	598
1939	521
1946	787
1946	560
1971	514
1981	681
1993	604
2006	637
2014	1268
2015	1261
2017	1246
2018	1241
2020 (Jan)	1266

== Politics ==
=== Municipal Council ===
The municipal elections on 26 May 2019 produced the following result:

- four seats Voter group "Per Region
- four seats CDU
- two seats single applicants

Four of the 10 municipal councillors are women.

=== Partnerships ===
Hohenberg-Krusemark is a partner municipality of Ellingen in Bavaria, initiated in 1989 after the opening of the border by the volunteer fire departments of Groß Ellingen and Ellingen in Bavaria. Furthermore, the local community Straßenhaus of the association community Rengsdorf-Waldbreitbach in Rhineland-Palatinate is a partner community of Hohenberg-Krusemark.

== Culture ==
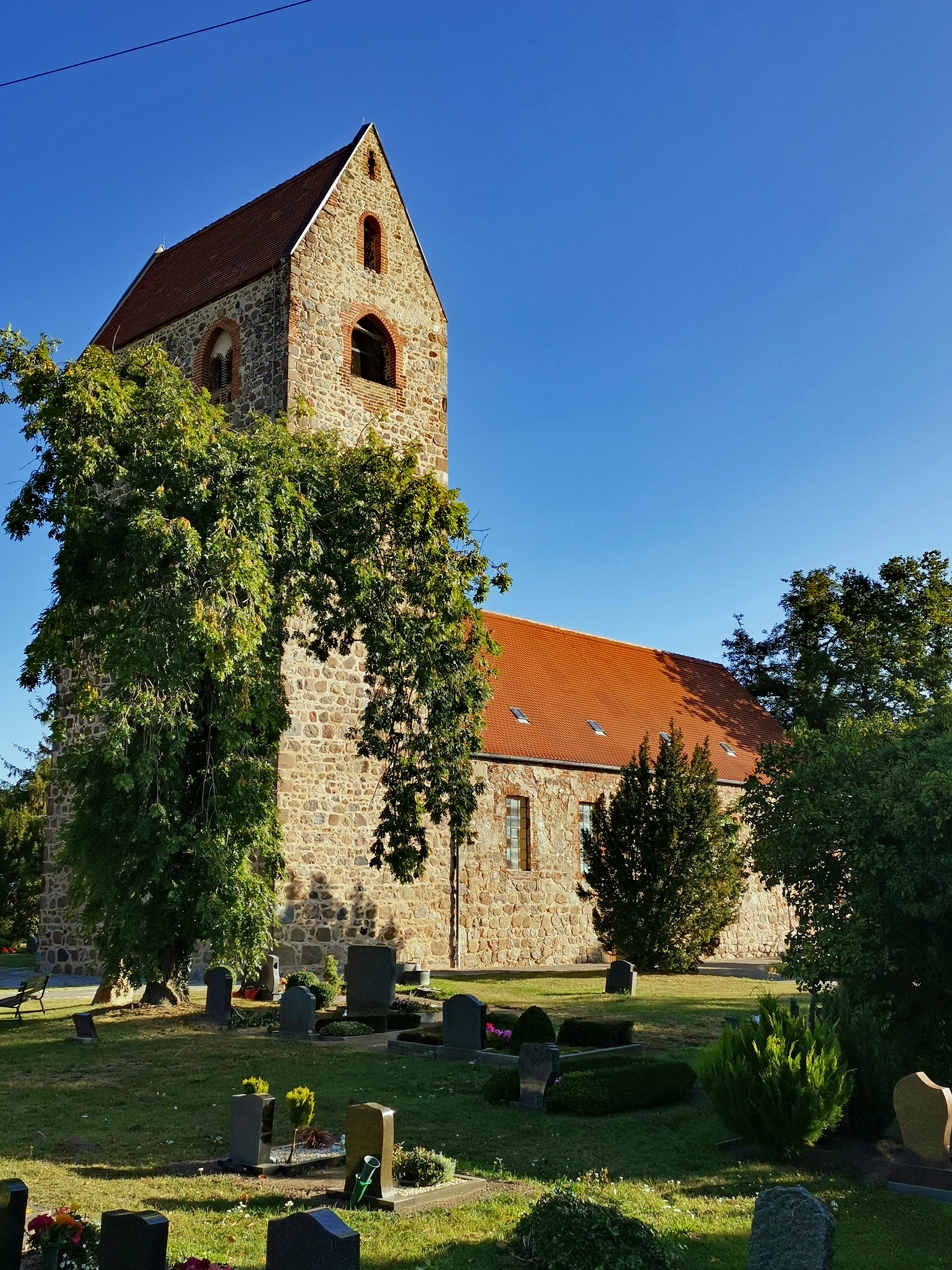
Evangelical village church Krusemark

=== Sports ===
Hohenberg-Krusemark was already a center of the horse sport at the time of the GDR. Every year, riding events are held here, especially in the areas of eventing and rural riding, which are organized by the equestrian sports club founded in 1881.

=== Associations ===
In Hohenberg-Krusemark there is an active club life which consists of the Heimatverein, the Interessenverein "Sternreiten in der Altmark" e.V., the Dorfentwicklungsverein, the Pferdesportverein "1881" Hohenberg-Krusemark e.V. and the Kulturförderverein "Östliche Altmark".

=== Religion ===
The 2011 European Union census showed that of the 1296 inhabitants of the municipality of Hohenberg-Krusemark, about 23% belonged to the Protestant and about 3% to the Catholic Church. The protestant village church of Krusemark is from the 12th century and is the oldest preserved building in the region.

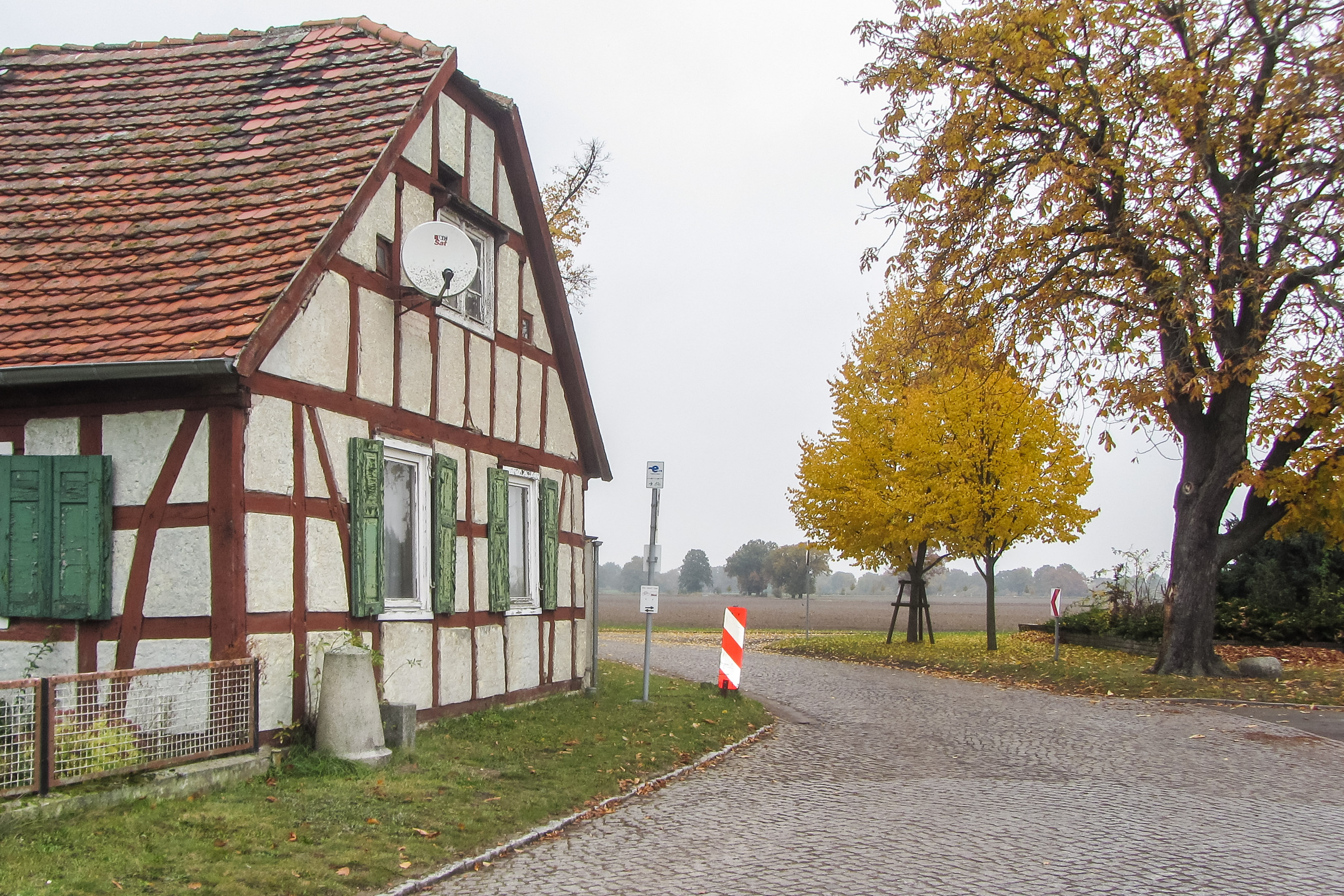
Listed half-timbered house in Schwarzwolz

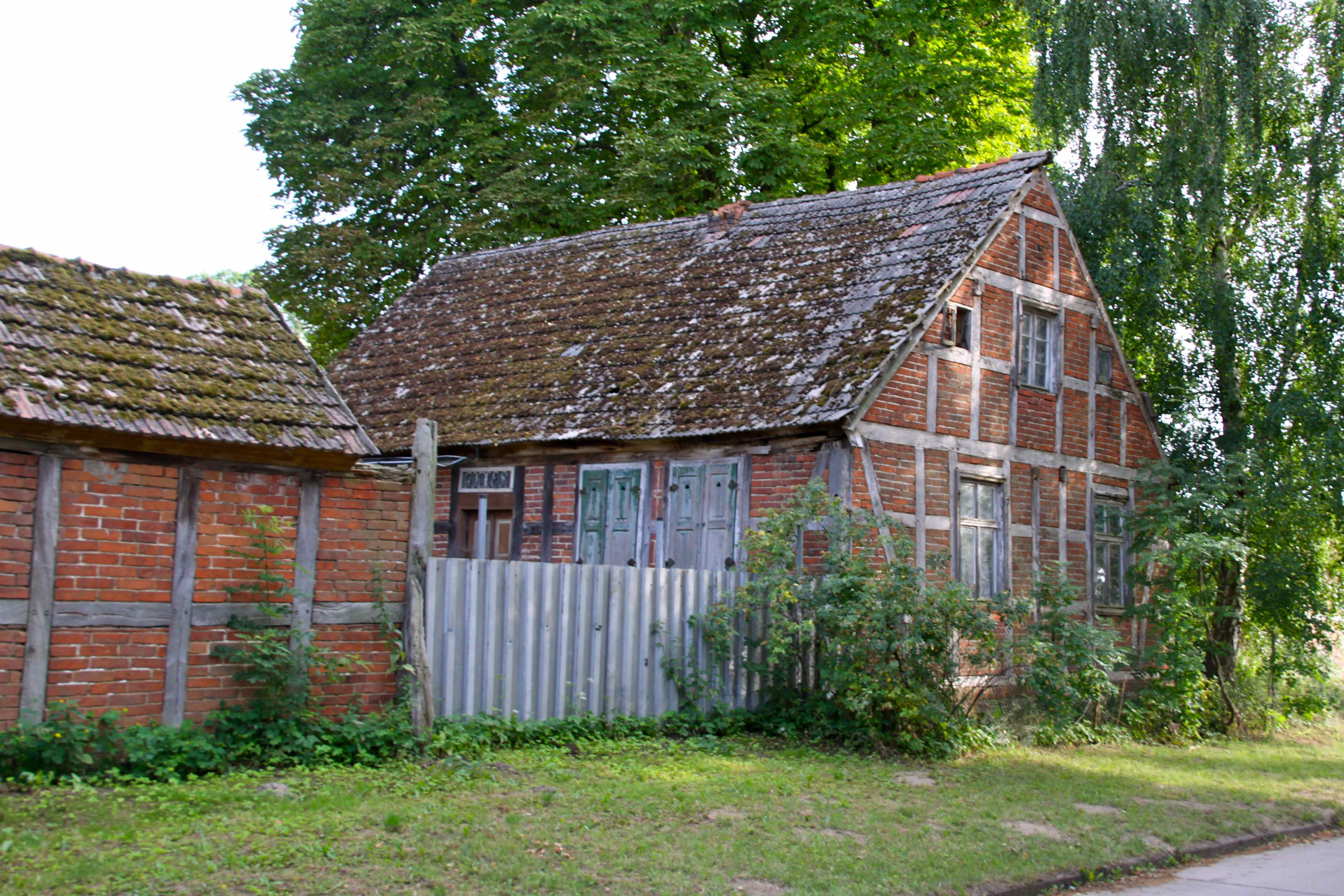
Groß-Ellingen farmhouse

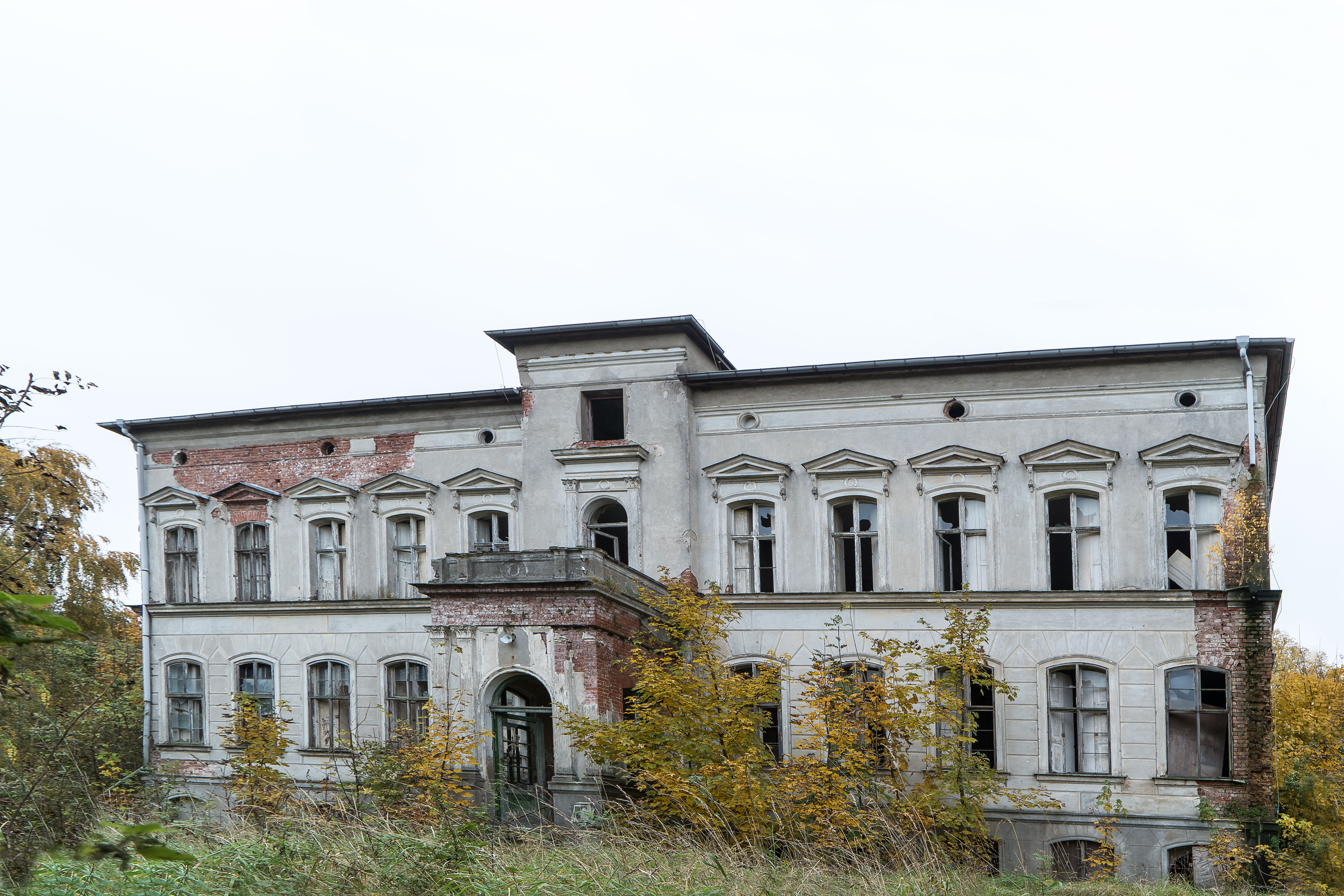
Osterholz manor

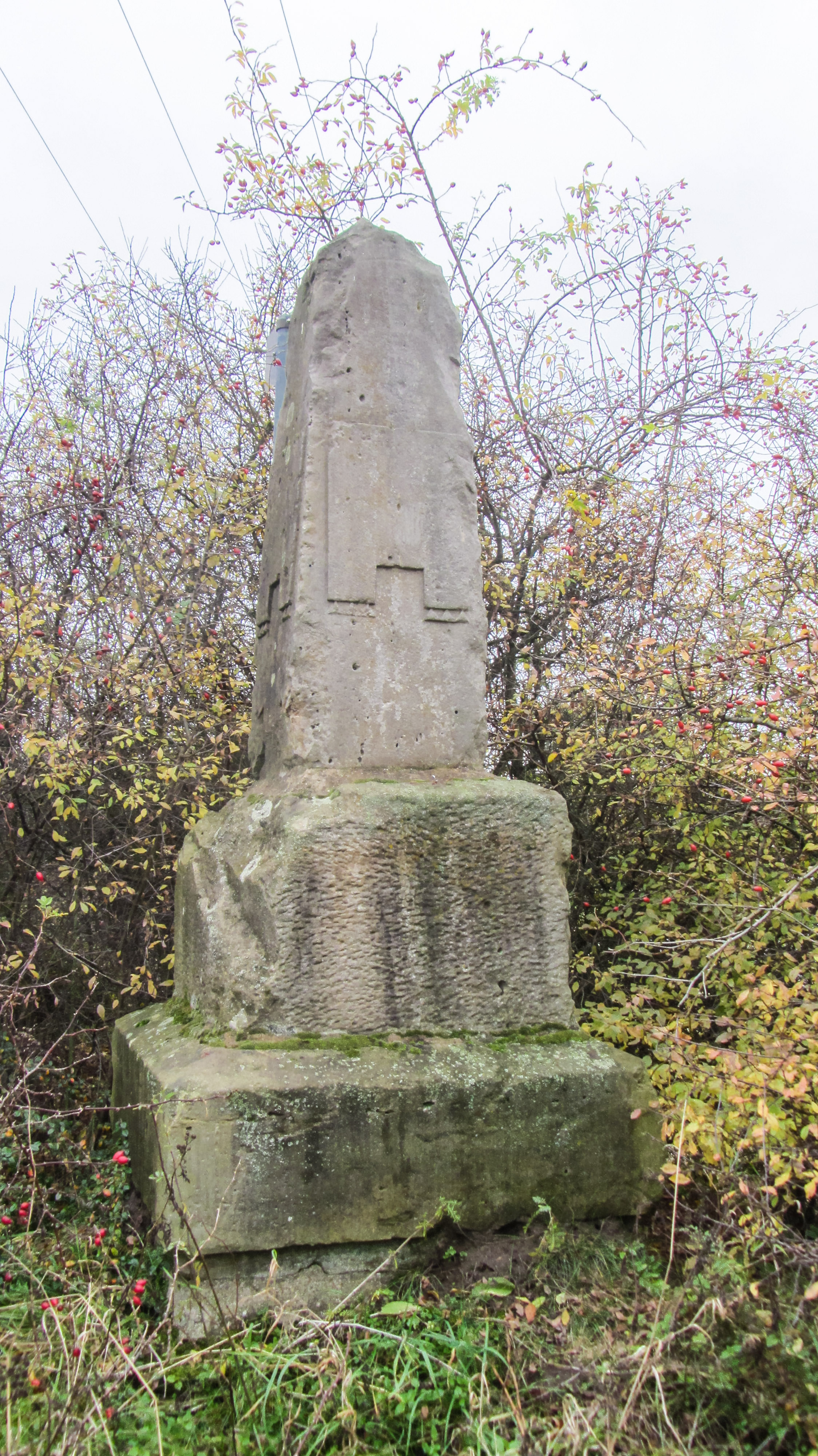
Altenzaun Prussian full mile obelisk

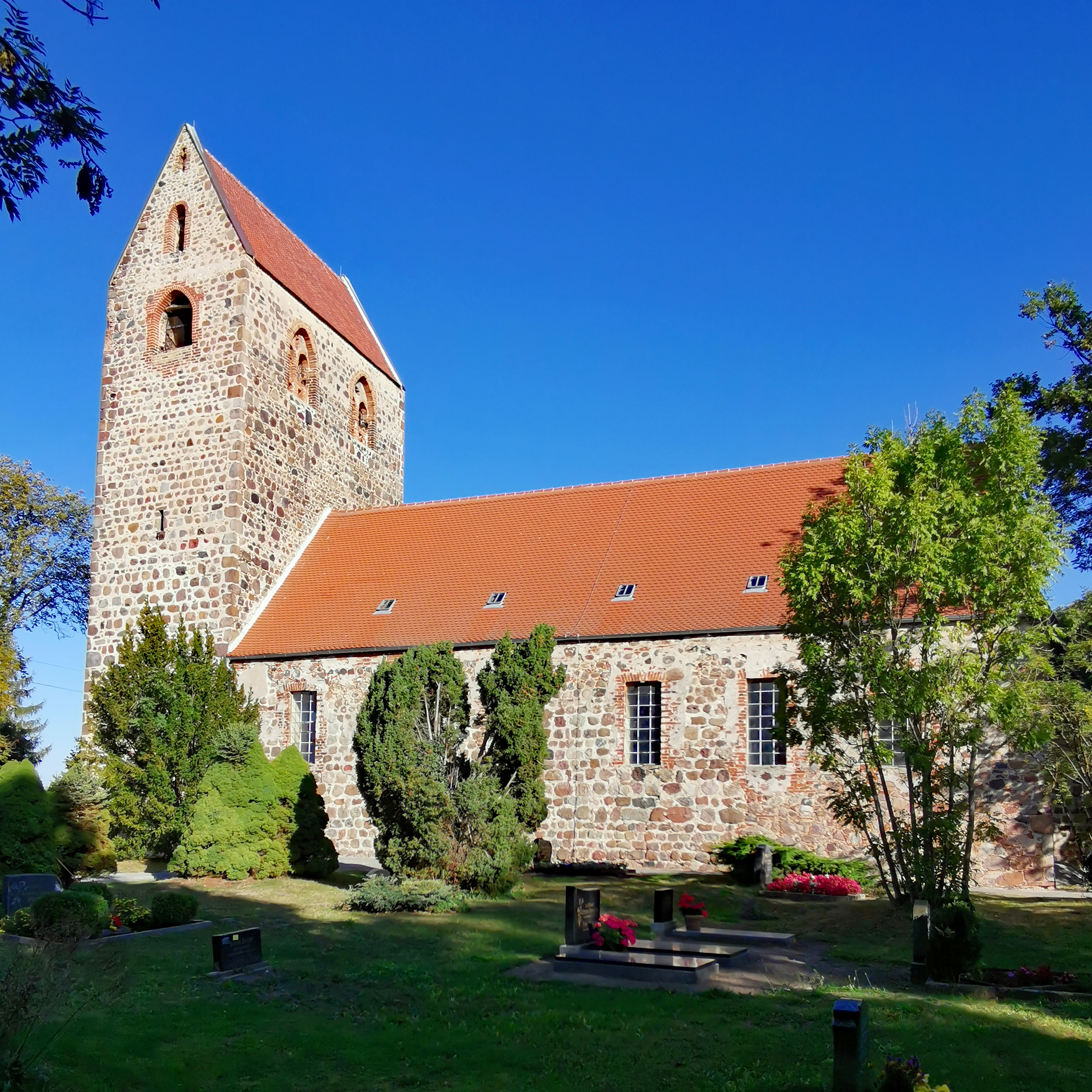
Hohenberg-Krusemark Church
