= Able (surname) =

Able is a surname. Notable people with the surname include:

- Forest Able (1932–2026), American basketball player
- Graham George Able (born 1947), British educationalist
- Whitney Able (born 1982), American actress and model

== See also ==
- Abel (surname)
