= Sigurd Abel =

German historian (1837–1873)

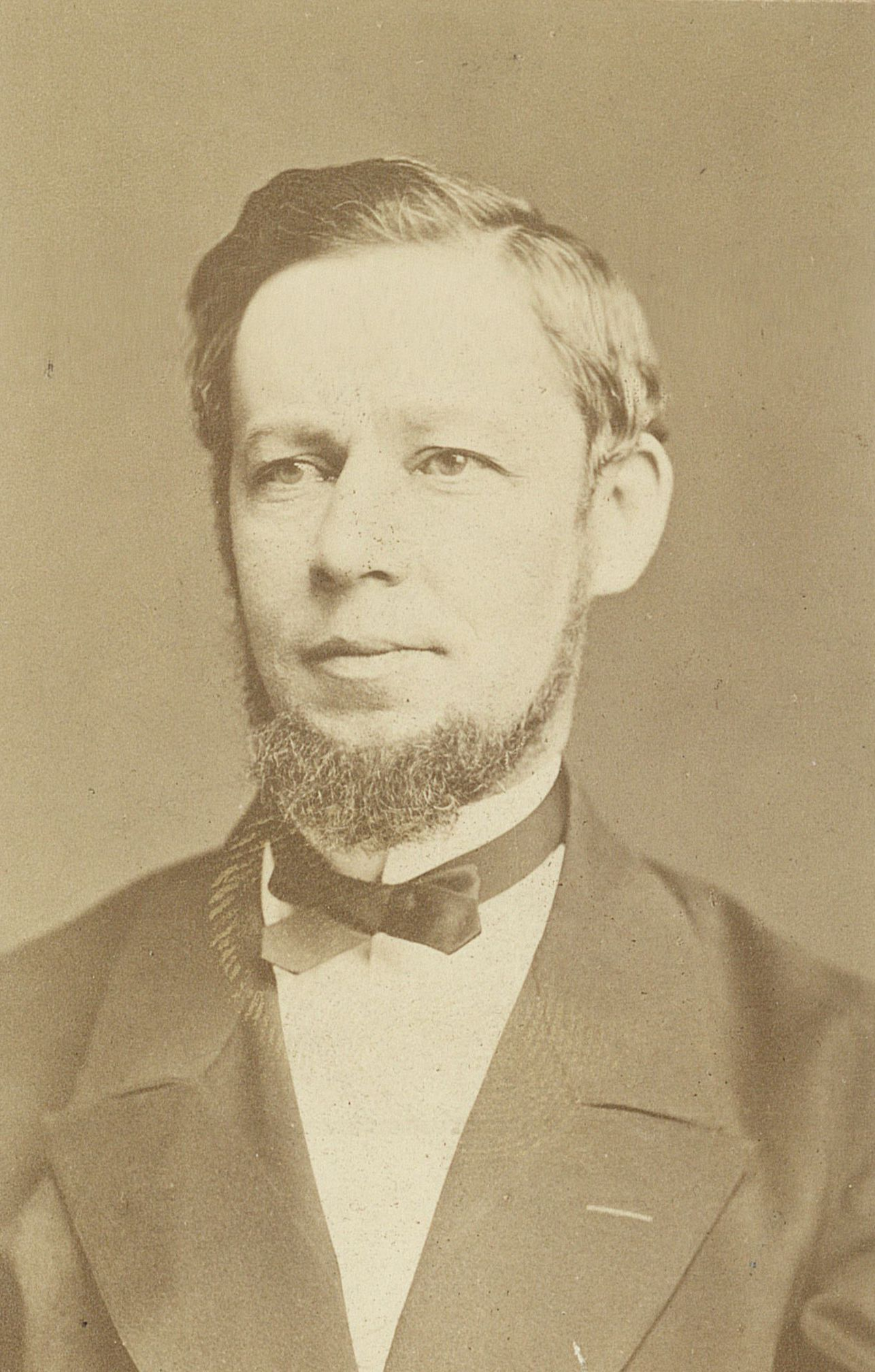
- Born: 4 June 1837
- Died: 9 January 1873 (aged 35)
- Education: University of Jena, University of Bonn, University of Göttingen and Humboldt University of Berlin
- Occupation: historian

Sigurd Abel (4 June 1837, Leonberg – 9 January 1873, Leonberg) was a German historian from Stuttgart.

== Education ==
Abel visited the seminary of Maulbronn and the college of Stuttgart. He then followed the steps of his cousin Heinrich Friedrich Otto Abel and began studying history in Jena, Bonn, Göttingen and Berlin. He earned his doctorate in summer 1859 with the historian Georg Waitz in Göttingen.

== Career ==
In 1861, Abel became a professor and private lecturer at University of Göttingen.

He was offered an extraordinary professorship from the university of Giessen in 1868.

== Personal life ==
In 1868, Abel's physical and mental condition forced him to return to his parental house in Leonberg, where he died in 1873.

== Publications ==
- Über den Untergang des Longobardenreiches in Italien, Göttingen 1859, thesis
- Papst Hadrian I. und die weltliche Herrschaft des römischen Stuhles, Göttingen 1861
- Geschichte Karls des Großen, volume I, 768–788, 1866, part of the almanac of German history published by the Historical Commission, Munich.
- Das Parteiwesen in England und die Coalition zwischen Fox und North im Jahre 1783

== Sources ==
- Allgemeine Deutsche Biographie - online version
