= Altenzaun =

- Ortsteil of Hohenberg-Krusemark
- Interactive map of Altenzaun
- Location within Germany Location within Saxony-Anhalt
- Coordinates: 52°44′41″N 12°1′59″E
- Country: Germany
- State: Saxony-Anhalt
- District: Stendal
- Town: Hohenberg-Krusemark

Area
  - Total: 11.12 km^{2} (4.29 sq mi)
- Elevation: 26 m (85 ft)

Population (2006-12-31)
  - Total: 127
  - Density: 11.4/km^{2} (29.6/sq mi)
- Time zone: UTC+01:00 (CET)
  - Summer (DST): UTC+02:00 (CEST)
- Postal codes: 39596
- Dialling codes: 039394
- Vehicle registration: SDL
- Website: www.altenzaun.de

Altenzaun is a village and a former municipality in the district of Stendal, in Saxony-Anhalt, Germany. Since 1 January 2009, it is part of the municipality Hohenberg-Krusemark.
