= Schwarzholz =

- Ortsteil of Hohenberg-Krusemark
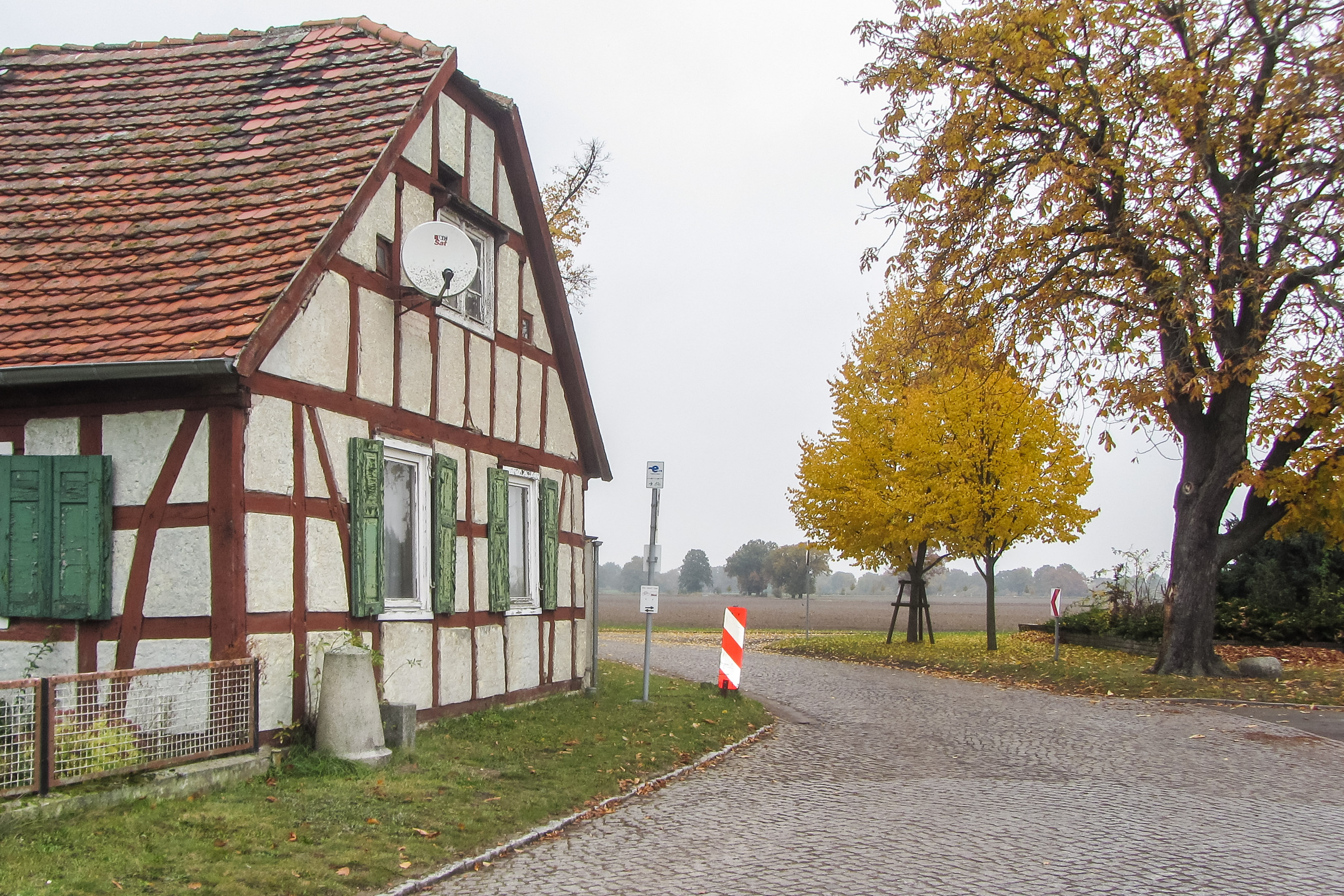
- Prussian round base stone in front of Dorfstrasse, Schwarzholz
- Interactive map of Schwarzholz
- Location within Germany Location within Saxony-Anhalt
- Coordinates: 52°45′N 11°59′E
- Country: Germany
- State: Saxony-Anhalt
- District: Stendal
- Municipality: Hohenberg-Krusemark

Area
  - Total: 12.82 km^{2} (4.95 sq mi)
- Elevation: 27 m (89 ft)

Population (2009-12-31)
  - Total: 232
  - Density: 18.1/km^{2} (46.9/sq mi)
- Time zone: UTC+01:00 (CET)
  - Summer (DST): UTC+02:00 (CEST)
- Postal codes: 39596
- Dialling codes: 039394
- Vehicle registration: SDL
- Website: www.arneburg-goldbeck.de

Schwarzholz is a village and a former municipality in the district of Stendal, in Saxony-Anhalt, Germany. Since 1 September 2010, it is part of the municipality Hohenberg-Krusemark.
