= Bob Wilkinson (cricketer) =

English cricketer (1939–2020)

Personal information
- Full name: Robert William Wilkinson
- Born: 23 December 1939; Rotherhithe, London
- Died: 19 March 2020 (aged 80); St Thomas' Hospital, London Borough of Lambeth
- Batting: Right-handed
- Bowling: Right-arm medium
- Relatives: Bobby Abel (great-uncle)

Domestic team information
- Years: Team
- 1959–1963: Kent
- FC debut: 23 May 1959 Kent v Middlesex
- Last FC: 3 July 1963 Kent v Essex

Career statistics
Competition	First-class
Matches	23
Runs scored	635
Batting average	19.84
100s/50s	0/2
Top score	63
Balls bowled	1,098
Wickets	10
Bowling average	62.60
5 wickets in innings	0
10 wickets in match	0
Best bowling	2/31
Catches/stumpings	11/–
- Source: CricInfo, 17 April 2020

Robert William Wilkinson (23 December 1939 – 19 March 2020) was an English cricketer.

Wilkinson was born at Rotherhithe in London in 1939. He played first-class cricket for Kent County Cricket Club between 1959 and 1963, making a total of 23 senior appearances for the county, scoring 635 runs and taking 10 wickets. He made his first-class debut against Middlesex at Gravesend in May 1959, going on to play 17 matches during 1959. He made five First XI appearances in 1960 and his final first-class match came in 1963. He played regularly for the county Second XI in the Minor Counties Championship and Second XI Championship between 1956 and 1964 and was awarded his Second XI county cap in 1958.

Wilkinson died at St Thomas' Hospital in the London Borough of Lambeth in March 2020. He was 80 years old.
