= Neurobiology of Learning and Memory =

- Discipline: Neuroscience
- Language: English
- Edited by: Ted Abel

Publication details
- Former name(s): Communications in Behavioral Biology Part A Behavioral Biology; Behavioral and Neural Biology
- History: 1968–present
- Publisher: Elsevier
- Frequency: Bimonthly
- Impact factor: 3.244 (2017)

Standard abbreviations
- ISO 4: Neurobiol. Learn. Mem.

Indexing
- CODEN: NLMEFR
- ISSN: 1074-7427 (print); 1095-9564 (web)
- LCCN: 95642180
- OCLC no.: 900953676

Links
- Journal homepage; Online archive

Neurobiology of Learning and Memory is a bimonthly peer-reviewed scientific journal covering neuroscience as it pertains to the processes of learning and memory. It was established in 1968 as Communications in Behavioral Biology Part A. It was renamed to Behavioral Biology in 1972, to Behavioral and Neural Biology in 1979, and to its current title in 1995. It is published by Elsevier and the editor-in-chief is Ted Abel (University of Iowa). According to the Journal Citation Reports, the journal has a 2017 impact factor of 3.244.
