= Kathryn Abel =

British psychiatrist

Kathryn M. Abel
- Education: Somerville College, Oxford
- Occupation: Psychiatrist

Kathryn M. Abel is a British clinical academic psychiatrist specialising clinically in schizophrenia and gender-specified service developments. She was NIHR National Lead for Mental Health for a decade until 2023 when she was appointed as co-chair of the Office for Life Sciences and UK Government's Mental Health Goals programme (formerly the Mental Health Mission), with Professor Husseini Manji.

Abel is Professor of Psychological Medicine and Reproductive Psychiatry at the University of Manchester, where she founded and is Director of the Centre for Women's Mental Health and the NHS's GM.Digital Research Unit.

Her research focuses on the mental and physical health of mothers; its influence on child development and brain development of children; and on how mental illness influences the lives of vulnerable women and their families.

She previously served on the Academic Faculty Executive at the Royal College of Psychiatrists and was a member of the National Institute for Health and Care Excellence Appraisal Committee C between 2008 and 2018. Abel has co-edited 5 textbooks and authored over 200 peer-reviewed publications. She was a Consolidator fellow of the European Research Council.

== Life ==
Kathryn M. Abel is a British academic psychiatrist specialising clinically in schizophrenia and gender-specified service developments. She qualified in Medicine from Somerville College, Oxford with an MA, and from the University of London with an MBBS and PhD.

She previously served on the Academic Faculty Executive at the Royal College of Psychiatrists and was a member of the National Institute for Health and Care Excellence Appraisal Committee C between 2008 and 2018. She is a fellow of the European Research Council.

Abel was elected a Fellow of the Academy of Medical Sciences in 2025.

== Bibliography ==
Abel has co-edited academic textbooks, including Mood and Anxiety Disorders in Women (Cambridge University Press, 2006), Comprehensive Women's Mental Health (Cambridge, 2016) and The Female Mind (RCPSYH, 2017).
