= Clementine Abel =

German writer (1826–1905)

- Born: Clementine Hofmeister; 15 January 1826; Leipzig
- Died: 30 November 1905 (aged 79); Leipzig
- Spouse: Ambrosius Abel
- Writing career
- Pen name: Clelie Betemann

Clementine Abel, alias Clelie Betemann (née Clementine Hofmeister) (born and died Leipzig, Germany; 15 January 1826 – 30 November 1905) was a German writer. She wrote poems and tales especially for children and teenagers, as well as articles for newspapers.

Abel was married to book shopper Ambrosius Abel.

== Works ==
- Meine Sonntage. Rückblicke und Erinnerungen (1882)
- An der Mutter Hand (1883)
- Sprüche, Strophen und Stimmungsbilder. Lyrisches und Didaktisches (1889)
