= Aabel =

Aabel is a Norwegian surname. Notable people with the surname include:

- Andreas Aabel (1911–1948), Norwegian actor
- Andreas Leigh Aabel (1830–1901), Norwegian physician and poet
- Hauk Aabel (1869–1961), Norwegian comedian
- Oluf Andreas Aabel (1825–1895), Norwegian priest and writer
- Per Aabel, Norwegian actor

== See also ==
- Aabel, cultivar of Phoenix dactylifera
