= Tom Abel (cricketer) =

English cricketer

Personal information
- Full name: Thomas Ernest Abel
- Born: 10 September 1890; Kennington, London, England
- Died: 23 January 1937 (aged 46); Lambeth, London, England
- Batting: Right handed
- Bowling: Right arm off break
- Relatives: Bobby Abel (father); William Abel (brother)

Domestic team information
- Years: Team
- 1919–1920: Surrey
- 1922–1925: Glamorgan
- FC debut: 16 May 1919 Surrey v Somerset
- Last FC: 29 July 1925 Glamorgan v Somerset

Career statistics
Competition	First-class
Matches	44
Runs scored	1,045
Batting average	15.83
100s/50s	1/2
Top score	107
Balls bowled	1,779
Wickets	31
Bowling average	31.48
5 wickets in innings	0
10 wickets in match	0
Best bowling	3/30
Catches/stumpings	18/–
- Source: CricketArchive (subscription required), 11 November 2017

Thomas Ernest Abel (10 September 1890 – 23 January 1937) was a first-class cricketer. He was born in Kennington in London and died in Lambeth. A right-handed batsman and off break bowler, he played for Surrey in 1919 and 1920 and, after failing to establish himself in the side, moved to Glamorgan for whom he played from 1922 to 1925. He qualified for Glamorgan by playing league cricket for Port Talbot and Maesteg Town and made his debut for his adopted county against a Combined Oxford and Cambridge XI at the Arms Park.

He played 44 first-class matches in all, for a modest batting average of 15.83, but he did score one first-class century, a knock of 107 against Leicestershire at Swansea. His best bowling, 3 for 30, came in a game against the Australian Imperial Forces.

He was the son of Bobby Abel, the Surrey and England cricketer and the brother of William Abel who played for Surrey between 1909 and 1926.
