= Hindenburg, Saxony-Anhalt =

Hindenburg
- Ortsteil of Hohenberg-Krusemark
- Interactive map of Hindenburg
- Location within Germany Location within Saxony-Anhalt
- Coordinates: 52°45′N 11°56′E
- Country: Germany
- State: Saxony-Anhalt
- District: Stendal
- Municipality: Hohenberg-Krusemark

Area
  - Total: 14.98 km^{2} (5.78 sq mi)
- Elevation: 28 m (92 ft)

Population (2006-12-31)
  - Total: 428
  - Density: 28.6/km^{2} (74.0/sq mi)
- Time zone: UTC+01:00 (CET)
  - Summer (DST): UTC+02:00 (CEST)
- Postal codes: 39596
- Dialling codes: 039394

Hindenburg is a village and a former municipality in the district of Stendal, in Saxony-Anhalt, Germany. Since 1 January 2009, it is part of the municipality Hohenberg-Krusemark.

The village is known as Hindenburg since the 13th century.
