= Roos Abels =

Dutch fashion model (born 1999)

- Born: Roos Jasmijn Abels; 23 September 1999 (age 25); Purmerend, Netherlands
- Modeling information
- Height: 1.80 m (5 ft 11 in)
- Hair color: Blonde
- Eye color: Blue
- Agency: The Industry Management (New York); IMG Models (Paris); Milk Management (London); Unique Models (Copenhagen); Model Management (Hamburg); Brave Model Management (Milan) (mother agency)

Roos Jasmijn Abels (born 23 September 1999) is a Dutch fashion model. She debuted as a Prada exclusive. At a young age, 14 years old, she courted controversy as to whether models under 16 should be allowed on the runway. She is ranked as a "Money Girl" on models.com. Vogue has compared her to top models Caroline Trentini, Natalia Vodianova, Gemma Ward, and Jessica Stam.

== Career ==
Abels was discovered in Amsterdam by former model Kim Akkerman and immediately signed to Brave Model Management. She walked in 40 shows during the F/W 2016 season, including Fendi (semi-exclusive), Versace, Lanvin, Chloé, Louis Vuitton, Céline Armani Privé, and Marni; and appeared in campaigns for Gucci and Dior. She has also appeared in ads for Emporio Armani, Prada, Calvin Klein, Zara, Mango, Emilio Pucci, and Coach New York.

Abels has appeared in editorials for W, Love, Vogue Italia, Vogue Paris, Vogue Australia, and Vogue China.
