= Caspar Abel =

German theologian, historian and poet

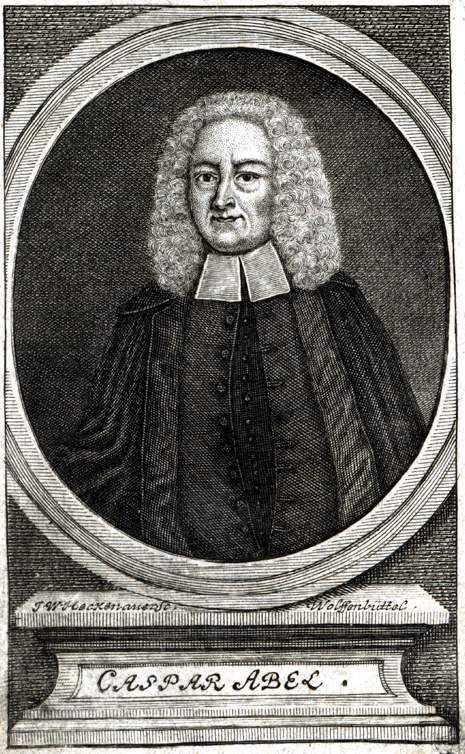
- Born: 14 July 1676; Hindenburg in der Altmark, Saxony-Anhalt, Germany
- Died: 11 January 1763 (aged 86); Westdorf, Salzlandkreis, Saxony-Anhalt, Germany
- Occupations: pastor, theologian, historian, poet
- Children: Joachim Gottwalt Abel
- Ordained: 1718

Caspar Abel (14 July 1676 – 11 January 1763) was a German theologian, historian and poet.

Abel was born in Hindenburg in der Altmark, the son of a pastor, and gained his theological education in Braunschweig and Helmstedt. In 1696 he became rector in Osterburg, in 1698 at the Johannisschule in Halberstadt. In 1718 he became pastor in Westdorf near Aschersleben where he died in 1763. His son Joachim Gottwalt Abel (1723–1806) also became a pastor.

Note: From 1748 to 1764 he was assisted by Johann Gottfried Bürger, the father of poet Gottfried August Bürger.

== Publications ==
- historical works:
  - Preußische und Brandenburgische Reichs- und Staatshistorie, 1710, 2 volumes, 8°
  - Preußische und Brandenburgische Reichs- und Staatsgeographie, 1711, 2 volumes, 8°, additions in 1747.
  - Deutsche und Sächsische Altertümer, 1729–32, 3 volumes, 8°
  - Stift-, Stadt- und Landchronica des Fürstenthums Halberstadt, 1745, 4°
- poems:
  - Jubelfest des Brandenburgischen Unterthanen, 1700
  - Abbildung eines rechtschaffenen Predigers, 1710
- translations:
  - Ovid's Heroids, 1704, 1723
  - Boileau's satires, 1729–32, 2 volumes

== Sources ==
- Allgemeine Deutsche Biographie - online version at Wikisource

== See also ==
- Friedrich Gottfried Abel, his son
