= Ted Abel =

American neuroscientist

Edwin "Ted" G. Abel is an American neuroscientist, and the founding Director of the Iowa Neuroscience Institute at University of Iowa and previously the Brush Family Professor of Biology at University of Pennsylvania.

Abel obtained his doctorate in biochemistry and molecular biology from Harvard University, after working there under mentorship from Tom Maniatis. He then became a postdoc under mentorship of Eric Kandel at Columbia University. He is an Elected Fellow of the American Association for the Advancement of Science and editor-in-chief of Neurobiology of Learning and Memory.
