= Heinrich Friedrich Otto Abel =

German historian (1824–1854)

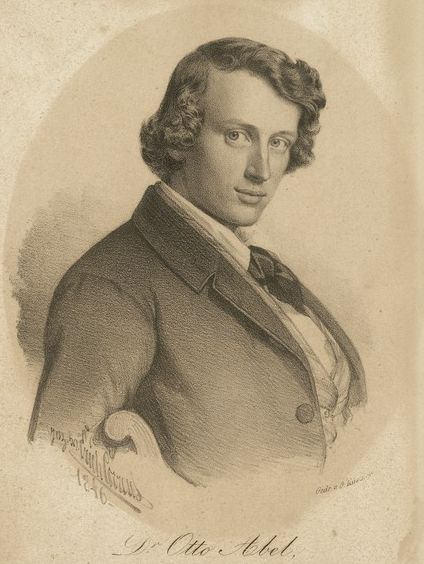
- Lithograph of Heinrich Friedrich Otto Abel
- Born: 22 January 1824; Reichenbach Priory, Kingdom of Württemberg
- Died: 28 October 1854 (aged 30); Leonberg, Kingdom of Prussia

Academic background
- Education: University of Tübingen; University of Jena; Heidelberg University; University of Bonn; Humboldt University

Academic work
- Discipline: History
- Institutions: University of Bonn

Heinrich Friedrich Otto Abel (22 January 1824 – 28 October 1854) was a German historian.

== Life ==
He was born at Reichenbach Priory in the Kingdom of Württemberg, a Protestant religious house, where his father was a clergyman. Beginning in 1824, Abel visited the universities of Tübingen, Jena, Heidelberg, Bonn and Berlin, studying history. Among his teachers was Friedrich Christoph Dahlmann.

Abel also showed political interest in the revolutions of 1848, and published a tract Das neue deutsche Reich und sein Kaiser ("The New German Empire and his Emperor") n which he enthused about the Kingdom of Prussia. As a result, the Prussian minister of external affairs, Heinrich von Arnim, offered him a place in the Prussian embassy in Frankfurt. However, his high expectations were disappointed many times over. He quit the diplomatic service in 1850 and in the ensuing period devoted his energies to the Monumenta Germaniae Historica.

In 1851, Abel inaugurated his formal academic career with his appointment as a lecturer ("Privatdozent") at the University of Bonn. The best known of his scholars was Heinrich von Treitschke. While travelling in 1853, Abel was affected by pulmonary phthisis and died in 1854 in the care of his uncle in Leonberg.

== Publications ==
- Makedonien vor König Philipp, Leipzig, 1847
- Das neue deutsche Reich und sein Kaiser, 1848
- König Philipp der Hohenstaufe, 1852
- Die politische Bedeutung Kölns am Ende des 12. Jahrhunderts, 1852
- Die deutschen Personennamen, 1853
- Theodat, König der Ostgoten, Stuttgart, 1855
- Kaiser Otto IV und König Friderich II, Berlin, post mortem 1856

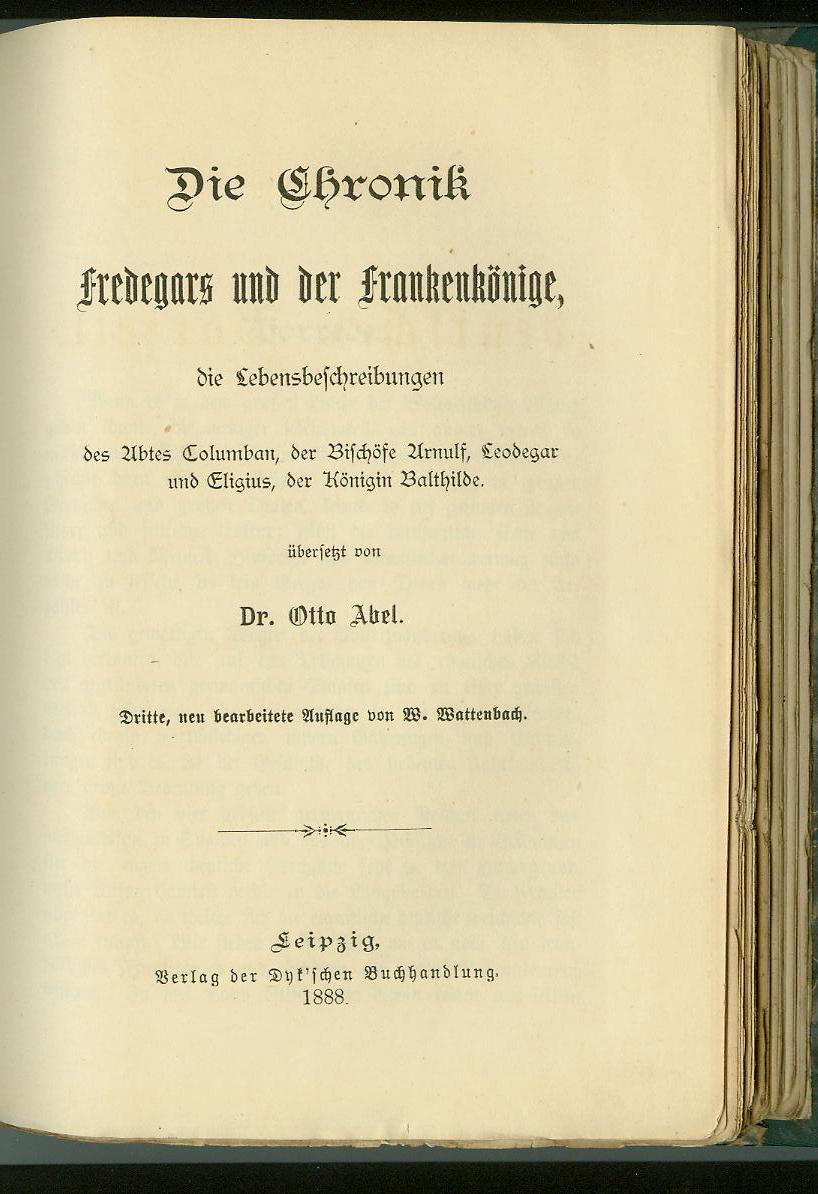
Title page of Abel's translation of the Chronicle of Fredegar

== Sources ==
- Allgemeine Deutsche Biographie - online version at Wikisource
