= Robert H. Abel =

American novelist

- Born: May 27, 1941; Painesville, Ohio
- Died: April 14, 2017 (aged 75); Hadley, Massachusetts
- Education: University of Massachusetts
- Occupations: Short story person, novelist

Robert Halsall Abel (May 27, 1941, in Painesville, Ohio – April 14, 2017, in Hadley, Massachusetts) was an American short story writer, and novelist.

== Career ==
Abel graduated from College of Wooster cum laude in 1964 with a B.A. in English, Kansas State University with a M.A. in English in 1967, and the University of Massachusetts, with an MFA in English in 1974. In 1968, he signed the "Writers and Editors War Tax Protest" pledge, vowing to refuse tax payments in protest against the Vietnam War.

His work appeared in Colorado Review, Dim Sum, Glimmer Train, Manoa, The Massachusetts Review, Mind's Eye, and Writers' Forum. He was a member of the Authors Guild.

== Personal life ==
He died at his home in Hadley, Massachusetts, on April 14, 2017.

== Awards ==
- 1991 Flannery O'Connor Award for Short Fiction
- 1978 National Endowment for the Arts Creative Writing Fellowship

== Works ==
- "An Incident in Hohhot". Mind Sprocket. October 9, 2007. Archived from the original on July 14, 2011.
- Riding a Tiger: a novel. Hong Kong: Asia 2000. 1998. ISBN 978-962-7160-50-2. (reprint: Soho Press October 2002)
- Ghost Traps. University of Georgia Press. 1991. ISBN 978-0-8203-1252-1. "Robert H Abel Robert H Abel."
- Full-tilt Boogie: stories. Lynx House Press. 1989. ISBN 978-0-89924-064-0.
- The Progress of a Fire. Simon and Schuster. 1985. ISBN 978-0-671-50931-6.
- Freedom Dues: or, A Gentleman's Progress in the New World. Dial Press. 1978. ISBN 978-0-8037-2575-1. (reprint 1980)
- Skin and Bones. University of Colorado Press. 1978.

=== Criticism ===
- "The Feng Shui Detective Goes South by Nury Vittachi". Asian Review of Books. May 8, 2002. Archived from the original on July 2, 2002.
