= Bobby Abel =

English cricketer

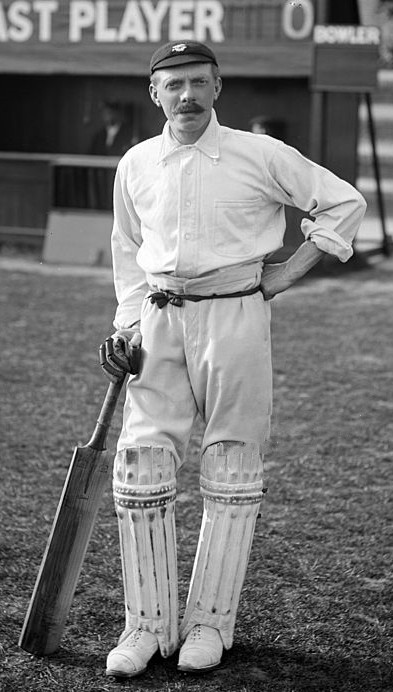
- Abel in about 1900

Personal information
- Full name: Robert Abel
- Born: 30 November 1857; Rotherhithe, Surrey, England
- Died: 10 December 1936 (aged 79); Stockwell, London, England
- Nickname: The Guv'nor
- Height: 5 ft 4 in (1.63 m)
- Batting: Right-handed
- Bowling: Right-arm off-break
- Relatives: Tom Abel (son); William Abel (son); Bob Wilkinson (great-nephew)

International information
- National side: England
- Test debut (cap 57): 16 July 1888 v Australia
- Last Test: 24 July 1902 v Australia

Domestic team information
- Years: Team
- 1881–1904: Surrey

Career statistics
Competition	Test	First-class
Matches	13	627
Runs scored	744	33,128
Batting average	37.20	35.46
100s/50s	2/2	74/145
Top score	132*	357*
Balls bowled	–	14,408
Wickets	–	263
Bowling average	–	24.00
5 wickets in innings	–	3
10 wickets in match	–	0
Best bowling	–	6/15
Catches/stumpings	13/–	587/–
- Source: CricketArchive, 5 October 2009

Robert Abel (30 November 1857 – 10 December 1936), nicknamed "The Guv'nor", was a Surrey and England opening batsman who was one of the most prolific run-getters in the early years of the County Championship. He was the first England player to "carry his bat" – opening the batting and remaining not out at the end of an innings – through a Test innings, and the first player to score 2000 runs in consecutive seasons – which he did each season from 1895 to 1902. In 1899 for Surrey against Somerset at The Oval, Abel carried his bat through an innings of 811, the highest total for which this feat has been achieved. His 357* in that innings remains a Surrey record, and was the highest score made at The Oval until Len Hutton scored 364 in 1938. Abel also played a record number of first-class matches in a season – 41 in 1902.

Abel was physically small, 5 feet 4 inches (1.63 m) tall and slimly built. He suffered in the later part of his career from serious vision problems that could have handicapped him against fast bowling; however, his ability to produce eccentric, unorthodox cross-batted strokes – particularly the pull around his legs – complemented with determination and stamina, brought Abel success even on difficult pitches, and made him popular with the public.

== Cricket career ==
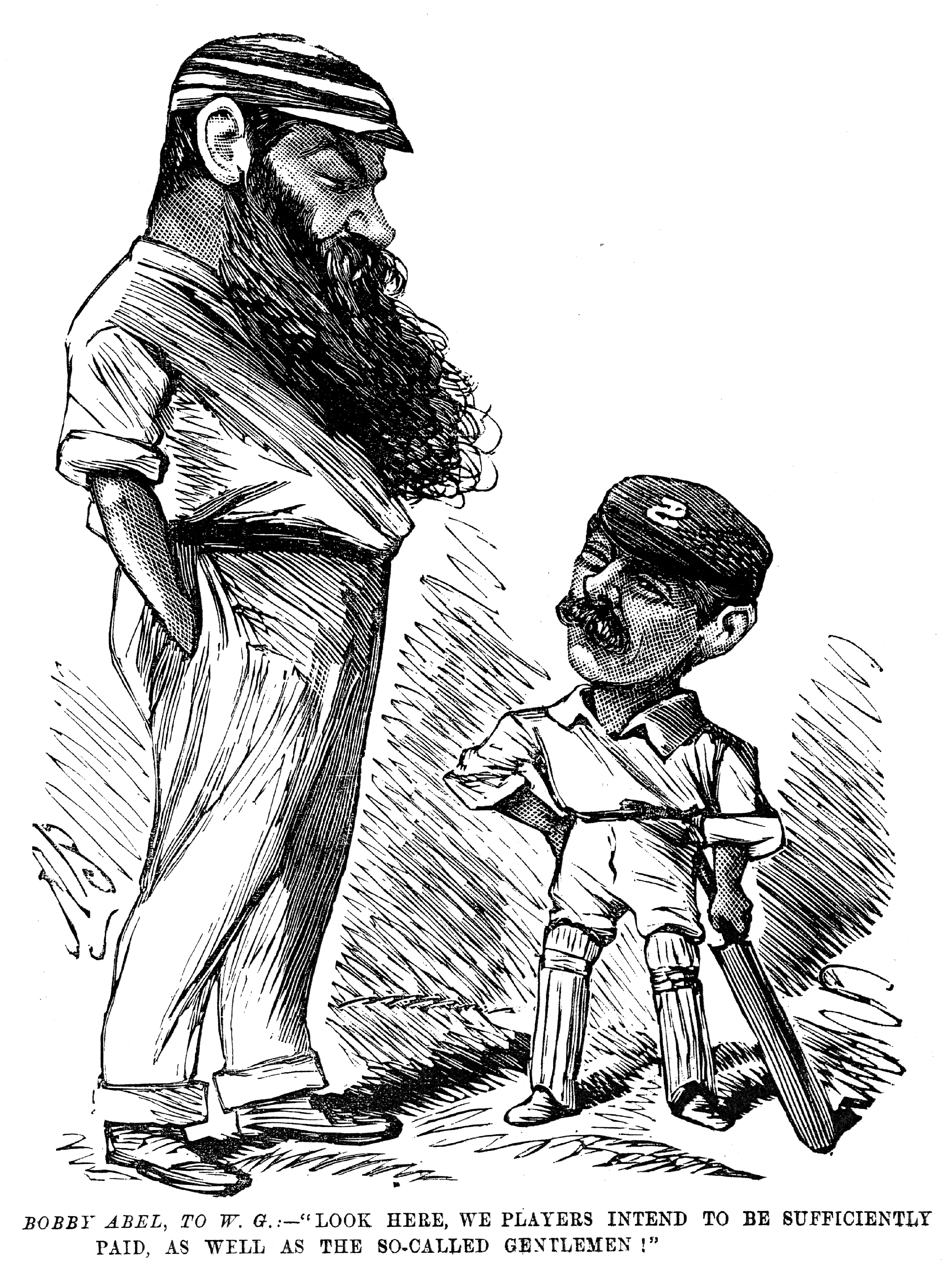
Bobby Abel, to W. G.:-"Look here, we players intend to be sufficiently paid, as well as the so-called gentlemen!" by Alfred Bryan, 1884 Entr'acte Annual

Abel first played for Surrey in 1881, but did not achieve much until 1883. He scored 1000 runs for the first time in 1886. In 1888 Abel scored 1323 runs including nine scores over fifty. In that year he played his first Test matches, scoring 70 in England's victory at The Oval against a side containing the fine bowler Charles Turner. In March 1889, Abel scored 120 in the Test match at Cape Town before England dismissed South Africa for 47 and 43, thus scoring more than the opposition managed in both of their innings.

For the next fourteen years, except for 1893 when he was handicapped by injury, Abel was always one of the leading run-scorers in England. Despite missing out on Test selection in 1890, Abel returned to his best form in 1891 and played well in Australia the following winter.

In 1895 Abel began to stand out as an exceptional run-getter, when he became only the fourth player ever to reach 2000 runs, including his first double hundred against Essex at The Oval. Although after 1896 his problematic eyesight made the Test selectors unwilling to choose him, Abel's accumulation of runs continued to increase: he was the only player to reach 2000 runs in 1897 and 1898, he scored 2685 runs in 1899, 2592 in 1900, and 3309 – the highest aggregate at the time – in 1901, before again scoring 2000 in 1902.

Abel's batting on "sticky wickets" in 1902 resulted in a recall from the national selectors for the Sheffield and Old Trafford Test matches, but he managed only four ordinary scores. Injury in 1903 caused the Surrey selection committee to drop him in early July. Even though he was fit again in 1904, Abel reached 50 only six times in 20 matches, and retired – to be replaced by Jack Hobbs.

== Later life and death ==
In later life, Abel became completely blind. He died at the age of 79 in Stockwell, London, and is buried in Nunhead Cemetery, along with his wife Sarah (née Reffell). They had 11 children. Two sons also played cricket for Surrey: Tom and William.

== Legacy ==
A blue plaque commemorating Abel was unveiled on the art gallery in Southwark Park in 2005.
