= William Abel =

English cricketer

Cricket information
- Batting: Right-handed
- Bowling: Right-arm fast medium

Career statistics
Competition	First-class
Matches	171
Runs scored	4,988
Batting average	22.98
100s/50s	1/25
Top score	117
Balls bowled	10,603
Wickets	186
Bowling average	30.93
5 wickets in innings	3
10 wickets in match	0
Best bowling	5/28
Catches/stumpings	146/–
- Source: CricketArchive (subscription required), 17 April 2020

William John Abel (29 August 1887 – 23 March 1934) was a first-class cricketer who played for Surrey County Cricket Club making his debut in 1909. He was a right-handed batsman and a right-arm bowler. He was born in South Bermondsey and died in Stockwell, London. His brother Tom Abel and father, the England and Surrey batsman Bobby Abel, were also first-class cricketers.

His last appearance in the County team was in 1926 and, after a few games with the Second Eleven, he joined Accrington, the Lancashire League Club. A batsman of the unorthodox school, Abel was a pleasing, forcing player and, even though he never gained the distinction of obtaining a century in County Championship matches, he put together many useful scores. Abel won his Surrey cap in 1910 and scored his only first-class hundred, 117, against Cambridge University in 1923. He took five wickets in an innings three times, with a best of 5 for 28 against Middlesex.

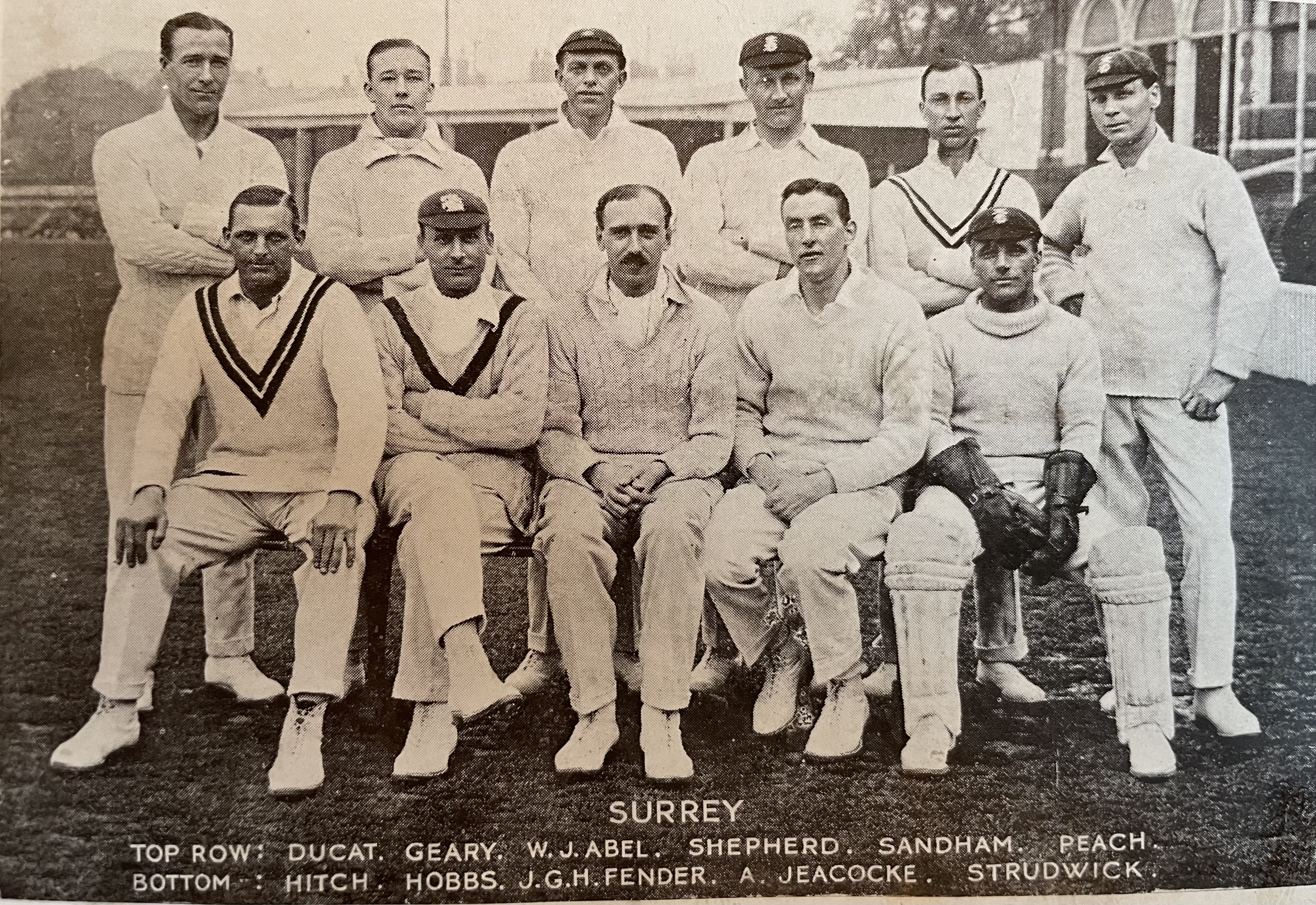
Surrey Cricket Team c1922

His best season was 1923 when he had an aggregate of 957 runs. However, in 1914, when Surrey won the County Championship, he scored 524 runs in sixteen county matches, with a highest score of 87. As a bowler, Abel began as a fast-medium bowler, but later reduced his pace and relied on the leg break and the googly. In his most successful season as a bowler, in 1919, he took 37 wickets. He was a first-rate slip fielder. After serving in the First World War, Abel did not enjoy good health.
