= Friedrich Gottfried Abel =

German physician (1714–1794)

Friedrich Gottfried Abel (8 July 1714, Halberstadt – 23 November 1794, Halberstadt) was a German physician, the son of historian Caspar Abel. He was an assessor of the college of physicians, member of the literary society at Halberstadt, and master of St. John's school in that city.

== Biography ==
After a classical education at Halberstadt and Wolfenbüttel, Abel entered himself at the former place as a student of theology, in 1731, under Johann Lorenz von Mosheim; a year later, he moved to Halle, where he attended the lectures of Christian Wolff and Alexander Gottlieb Baumgarten, and often preached himself with much applause.

Though he had a great chance of succeeding to the rectorship of St. John's school in his native place, Abel in a few years gave up theological pursuits altogether, applied to medicine at Halle, and in 1744 was admitted to the degree of doctor at Königsberg in Prussia. On his return to Halberstadt, he practised as a physician for over half a century before his death in 1794.

In the early part of his life, Abel had made a poetical translation of the Satires of Juvenal into German, which, by the advice of his friend Gleim, he retouched a few years before his death, and published in 1788. He intended to correct and publish Ovid's Remedia Amoris, which he had also translated in his youth, and to attempt Persius, but age and other occupations prevented him from accomplishing this.

Abel married in 1744, and left three daughters and two sons, one of whom, John Abel, physician at Düsseldorf, has distinguished himself as a writer.
