= Chris Abel =

English footballer

Personal information
- Full name: Christopher Robert Abel
- Date of birth: 28 April 1912
- Place of birth: Gorton, England
- Date of death: 1986 (aged 73–74)
- Position: Defender

Senior career*
Years	Team	Apps	(Gls)
1934	Leeds United	1	(0)
1936	Bradford City	14	(0)
- Stalybridge Celtic
- * Club domestic league appearances and goals

Christopher Robert Abel (28 April 1912 – 15 September 1986) was a footballer who played in the Football League for Bradford City and Leeds United. He was born in Gorton, Manchester, England.
